= Carbodies =

English car manufacturing company

- Formerly: London Taxis International; The London Taxi Company
- Type: Private
- Industry: Automotive
- Founded: 1919
- Founder: Robert Jones
- Defunct: 2013
- Fate: In liquidation
- Successor: London EV Company
- Headquarters: Coventry, England
- Products: Car bodies (1919–1971); Assembly of Austin taxi bodies (1948– ); Complete Taxis (1982–2013)
- Owner: Robert Jones (1919–1954); BSA Group (1954–1973); Manganese Bronze Holdings (1973–2013)
- Website: www.lti.co.uk (archived snapshot)

Carbodies was a taxi design and manufacturing company based in Coventry, England. In its latter years it also traded as London Taxis International and The London Taxi Company.

It operated a coachbuilding business on Holyhead Road, Coventry. After half a century making short runs of limited demand bodies for major manufacturers it was obliged to replace these now moribund activities and in 1971 took from its former customer and supplier of taxi chassis, Austin, the manufacture of complete London taxicabs. Two years later was bought by Manganese Bronze Holdings.

Rebranded as The London Taxi Company in October 2010, it was placed in administration in October 2012, with certain assets purchased by Geely to form what is now the London EV Company.

== History ==
The origins of The London Taxi Company can be traced to 1919, when Robert 'Bobby' Jones, a former general manager at coachbuilder Hollick & Pratt took over the coachbuilding operations of his then employer, timber merchants Gooderhams and set up in business in premises acquired from Thomas Pass in West Orchard, Coventry.

=== 1919–1954 ===
==== Standardised Coachwork ====
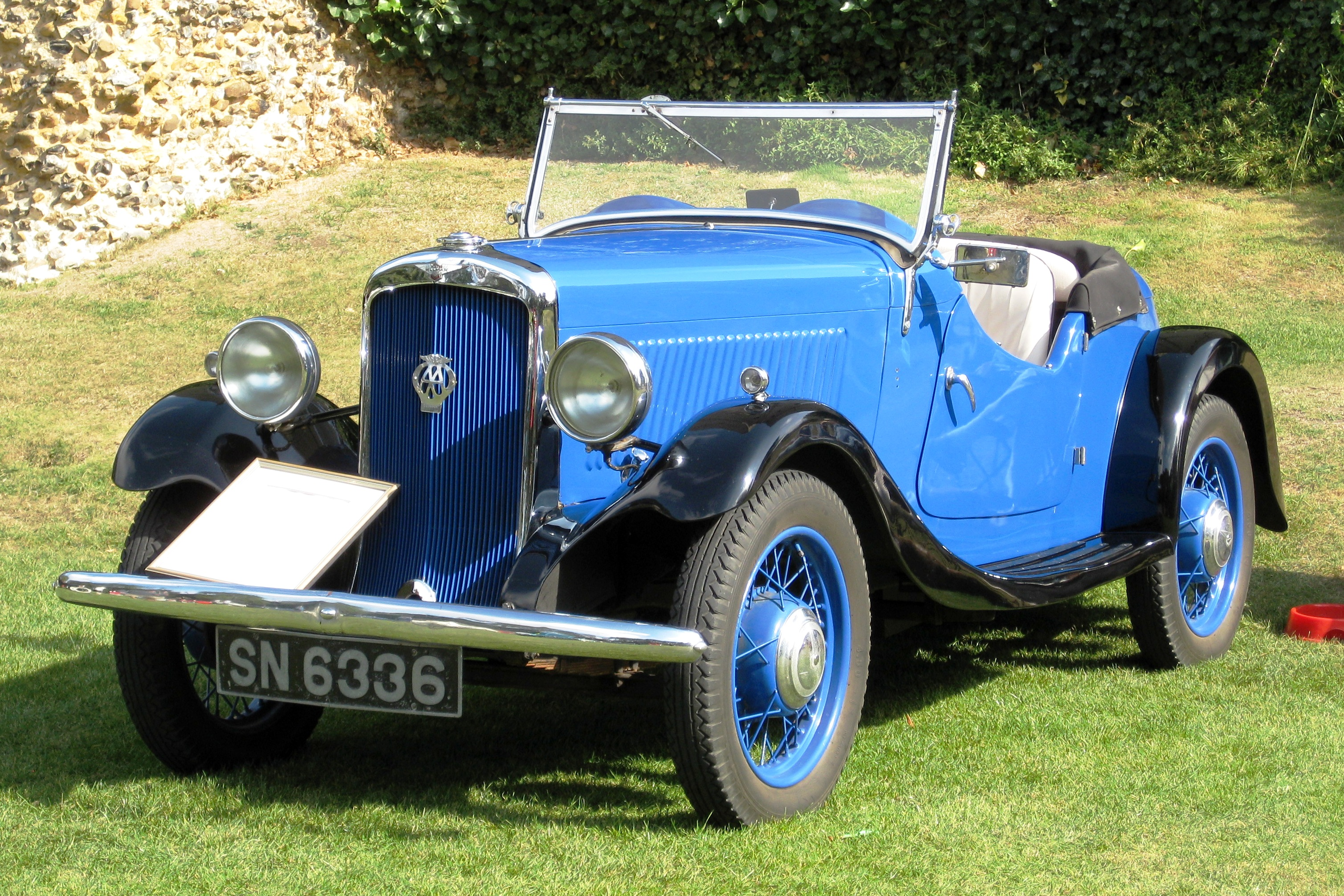
Hillman Minx sports tourer 1934

Hillman Minx drophead coupé 1947

Rather than make bespoke bodies to individual designs, Carbodies set out to produce coachwork to a number of standardised designs for car companies that did not have their own coachbuilding facilities. Their first major customers during the 1920s were MG and Alvis Cars. The scale of a new contract to build bodies for the MG M-Type Midget meant that they needed larger premises and in 1928, they moved to a larger site on Holyhead Road, where they remain to this day. In the 1930s, they supplied bodies for Rover, Invicta and Railton, but by far their biggest and most important customer in that decade was the Rootes Group.

During World War II the company made bodies for military vehicles. They also acquired press tools through the Lend-Lease scheme, which enabled them to make aircraft components. In 1943, Carbodies also became a limited company at this time, with Bobby Jones as governing director and his son, Ernest Jones managing director.

==== Taxicabs, Convertibles, Daimlers and other Postwar Vehicles ====
After the war, Carbodies negotiated with London taxi dealer Mann & Overton and Austin to make bodies for the Austin FX3 taxi, introduced in 1948, as well as finishing and delivering the complete vehicles. More than 7,000 FX3s, mainly destined for London, were produced over 10 years. They also developed a system for turning modern all-steel saloon cars into convertibles. This work was carried out on the early unit construction Hillman Minx, the Austin Somerset and Hereford, the Ford Mk1 Consul and Zephyr and, later the Mk2 Ford Consul, Zephyr and Zodiac.

=== BSA ownership (1954–1973) ===
In 1954, Bobby Jones sold Carbodies to the BSA Group, who put it under the control of its prestige car company, Daimler. Although it was intended for Carbodies to become the manufacturing plant for Daimler steel bodies, this was never fulfilled. It did, however convert the Conquest saloon into a drophead, using the same methods they used on Fords and Austin and also made a drophead coupe body for the Daimler Conquest Roadster and made bodies for the Daimler Majestic and Majestic Major saloons.

Under BSA, manufacturing facilities were extended and more plant installed. In 1958, Carbodies began manufacturing the body and carrying out the assembly, finishing and delivery of the most important vehicle in their history, the Austin FX4 taxi. Carbodies also supplied prototype bodies and tooling, projects including the Jaguar E-type bonnet and panels for Triumph, Ariel and BSA motorcycles and scooters.

Further contracts undertaken during the 1960s and early 1970s were the conversion of Humber Hawk and Super Snipe, Singer Vogue and Triumph 2000 saloons into estate cars, but gradually, as contract work on private cars and commercial vehicles fell away, the FX4 taxi would become more important for the company.

In 1971 Carbodies bought the FX4 chassis assembly line from British Leyland's Adderley Park, Birmingham factory and moved it to Coventry, making them complete manufacturers of the FX4, in actuality if not in name.

=== Manganese Bronze ownership (1973–2013) ===
In 1973, Carbodies was included in the sale of BSA to Manganese Bronze Holdings. In the 1970s, Carbodies tried to make a new taxi of their own, the FX5, but it was abandoned in 1979 because the development costs were too high.

In 1982 Carbodies took responsibility for the complete manufacture of the FX4 taxicab, after British Leyland lost interest in it. By this time, the FX4 was the company's only product, despite attempts to introduce new lines, such as a Ford Cortina MkV convertible and the Range Rover Unitruck. A new model of taxi, the CR6, based on a Range Rover bodyshell was abandoned after almost five years of development. In 1984, the London taxicab dealer Mann & Overton was bought by Manganese Bronze Holdings. Pending the development of a new model, the FX4 was further developed and became the LTI Fairway.

==== Rebranded as London Taxis International ====
In 1992 the company was rebranded London Taxis International with three divisions: LTI Carbodies, LTI Mann & Overton and London Taxi Finance.

In 1997, a new model of taxicab, the TX1 was introduced as a successor to the FX4. Further development resulted in the launch in 2002 of the TXII, powered by a Ford Dura Torq 2.4-litre diesel engine and featuring an integral fold-down ramp for wheelchair users. It also has an intermediate step and swivel-out seat for passengers with moderate walking difficulties. For people with hearing problems it has an induction loop incorporated in the intercom system.

In 2007 the TXII was replaced by the TX4. This series established LTI Vehicles as a worldwide supplier of London-type taxis.

In October 2010 the London Taxis International was rebranded as The London Taxi Company. A joint venture with Chinese car maker Geely, who already held a 20% interest in the company through its Manganese Bronze shareholding, was formed to build a factory in Shanghai to manufacture London taxis for the export market and to supply components to the home factory in Coventry. In 2010 the Mann & Overton trading name was dropped.

==== Administration ====
In October 2012, following a suspension of sales due to the discovery of a serious flaw with vehicle steering components and having failed in an attempt to obtain new financing, the company was placed in voluntary administration. The quite recently specified faulty steering components had been sourced from Geely supplier, Gang Yang in China.

In February 2013, certain assets of The London Taxi Company were purchased from administrator PricewaterhouseCoopers by Geely. It continued to trade as The London Taxi Company until rebranded as the London EV Company in September 2017 developing electric commercial vehicles at a new plant near Coventry, the first into production being an electric taxicab - the LEVC TX.

== Gallery ==
=== Carbodies' MGs ===
They provided most bodies for the separate chassis cars

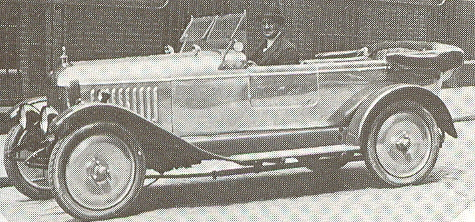
MG 14/28

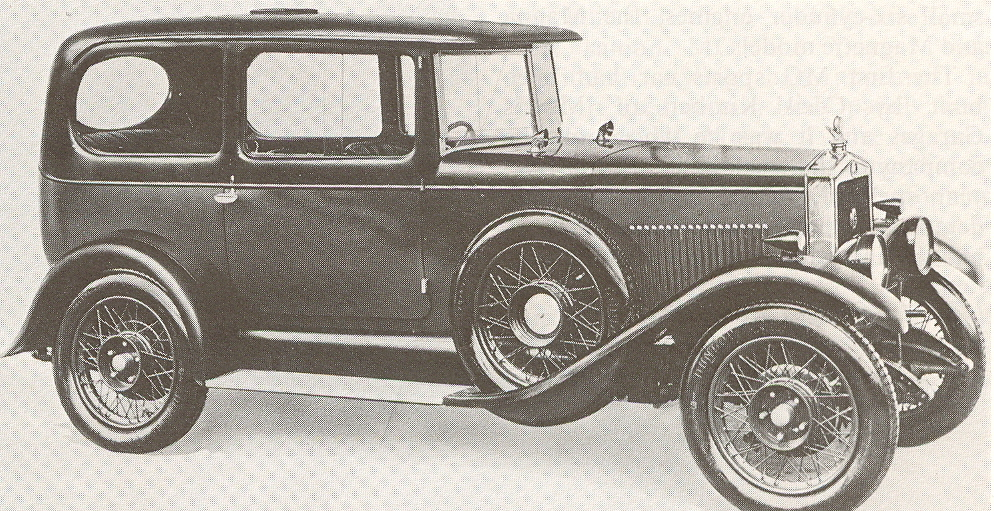
MG 14/40

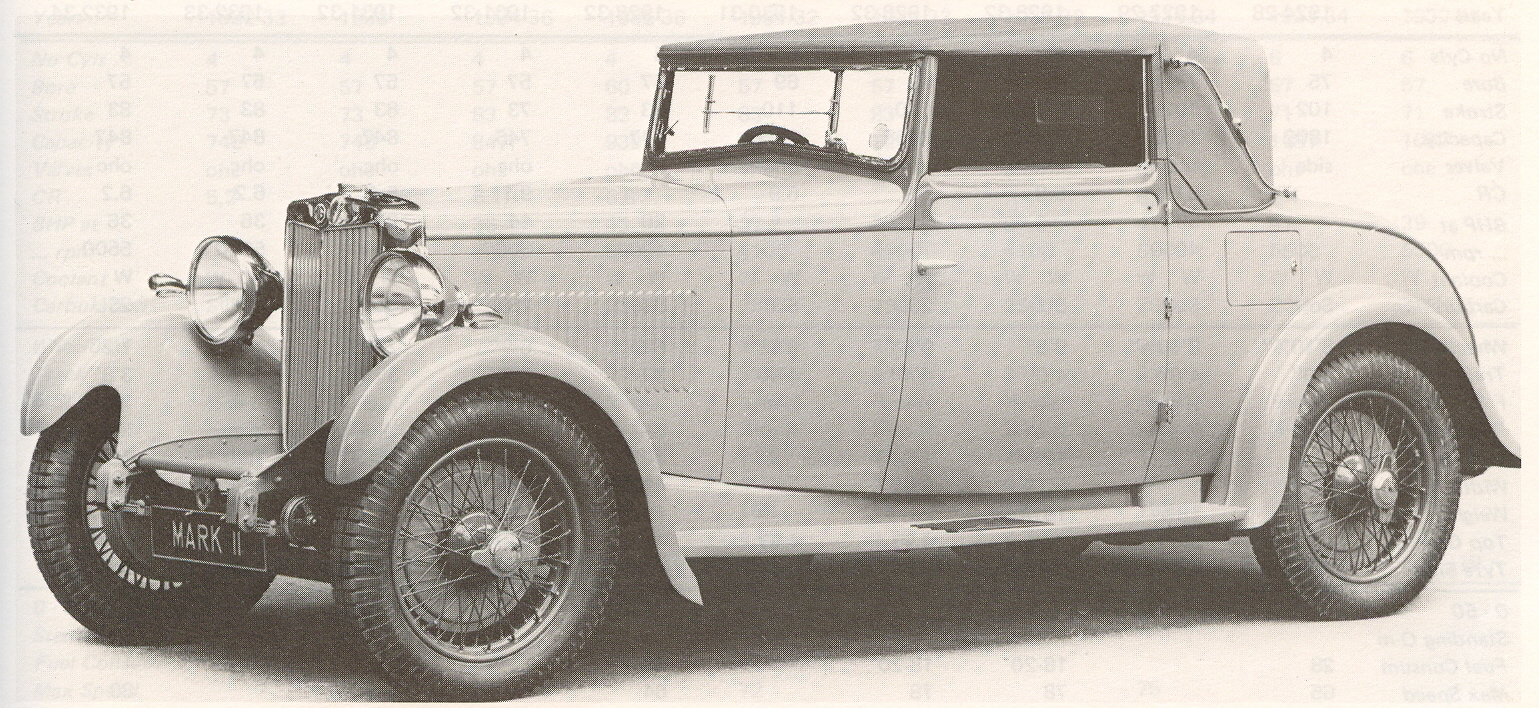
MG 18/80 Mark II Coupé

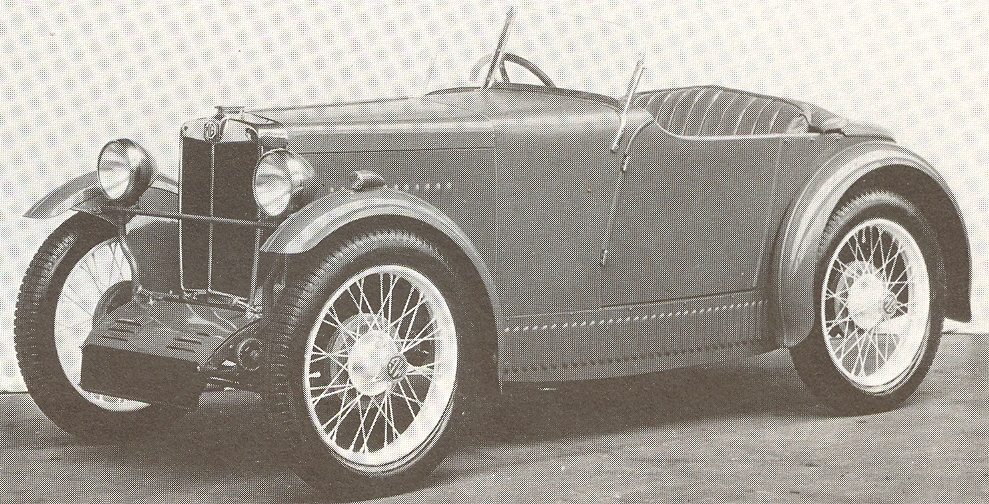
MG M-type

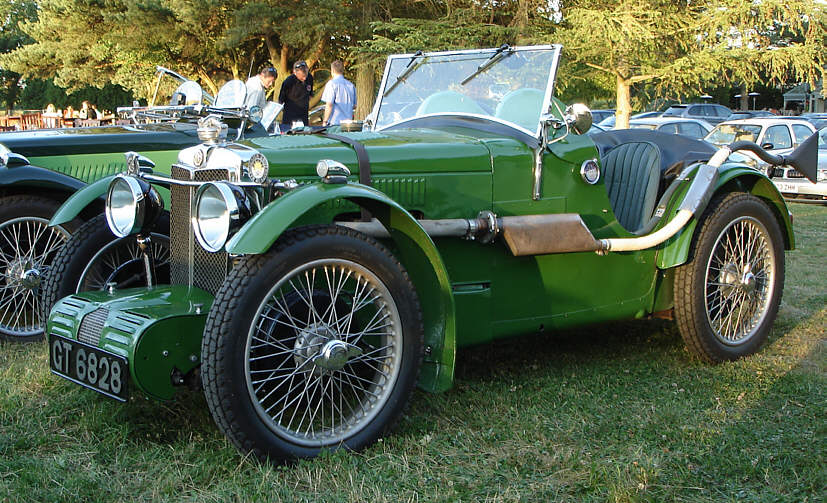
MG C-type

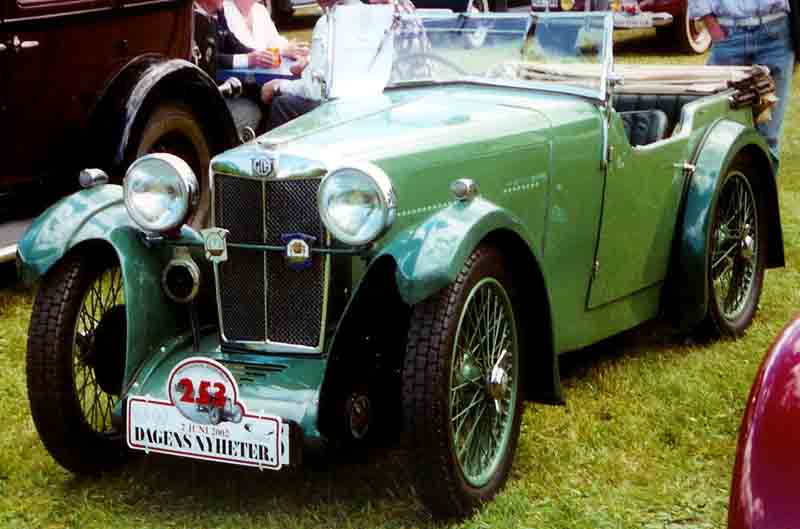
MG D-type

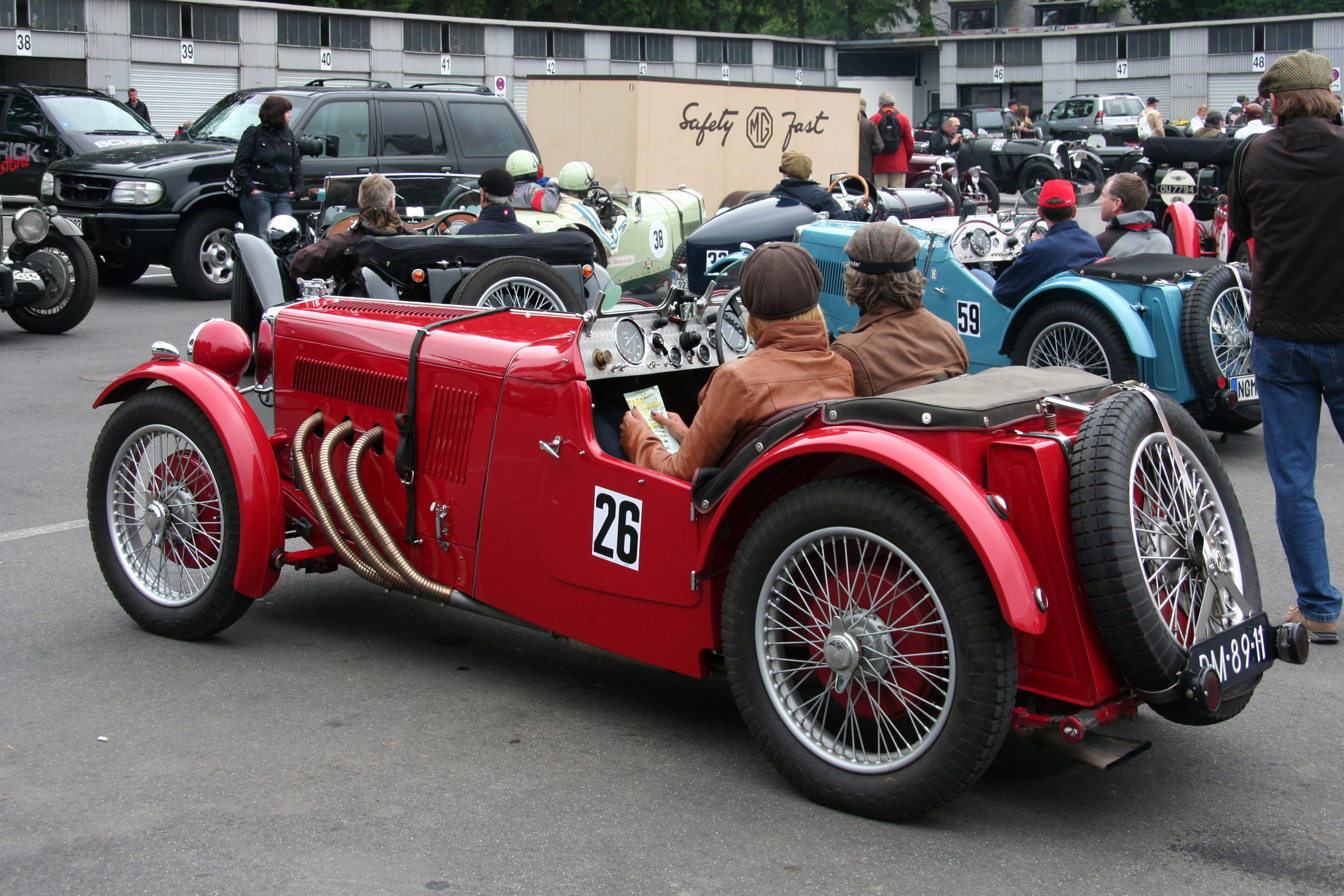
MG F2

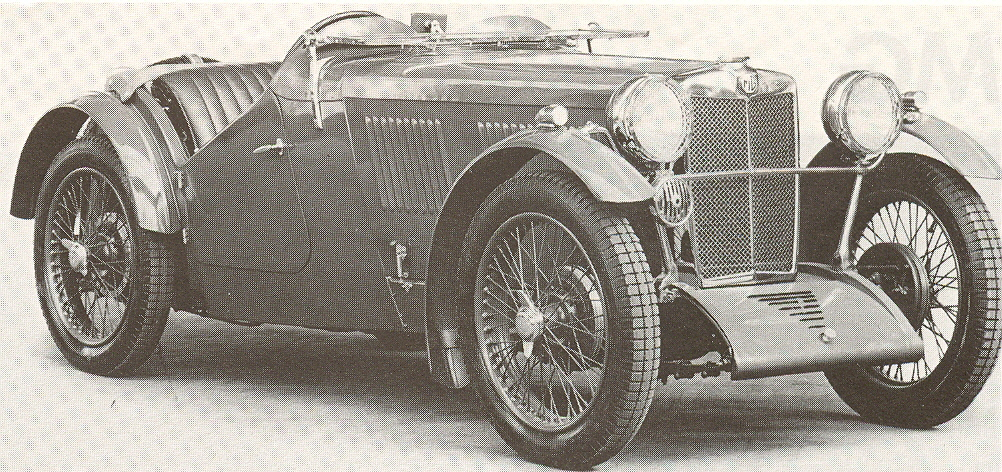
MG J2

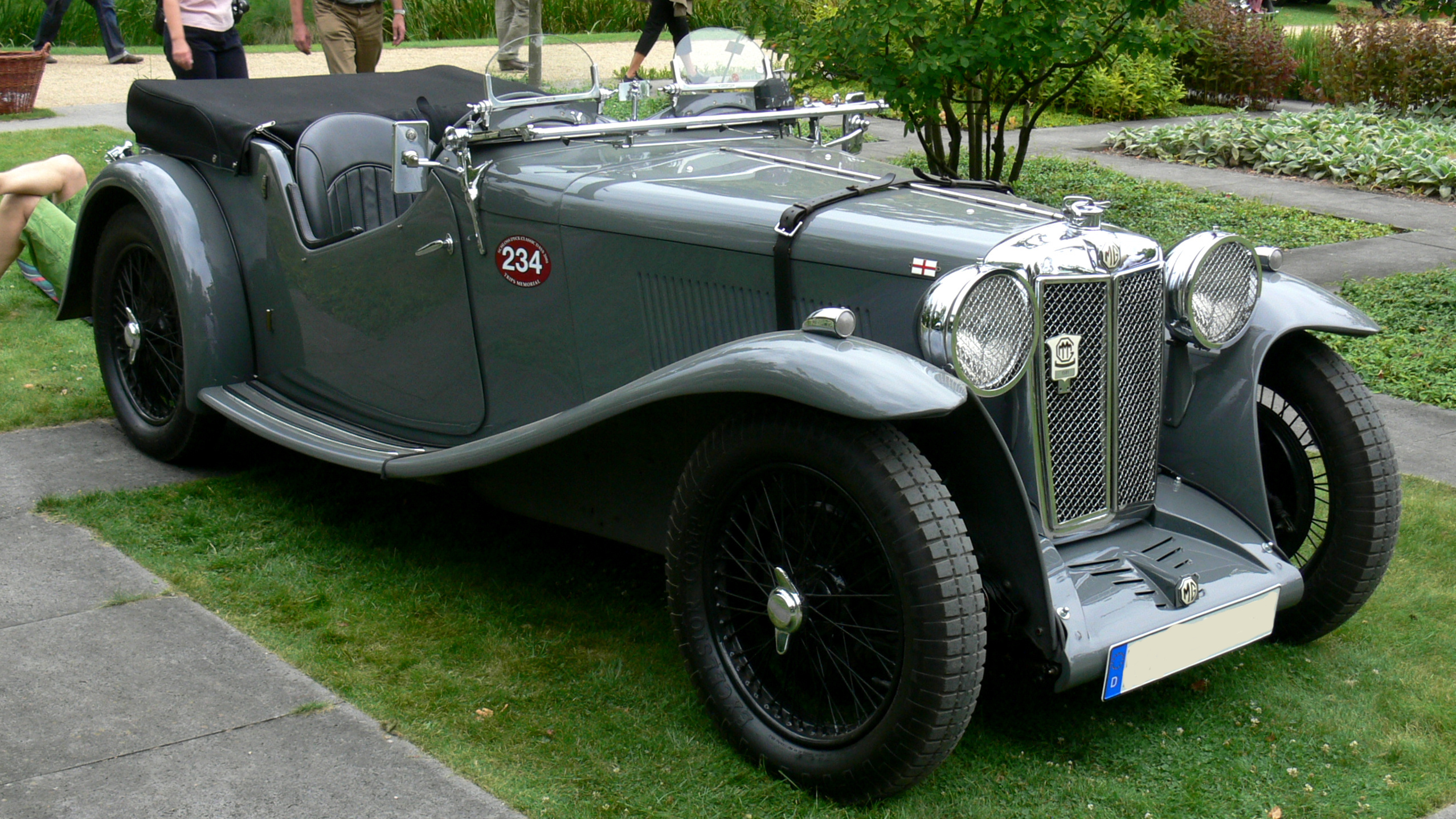
MG K1

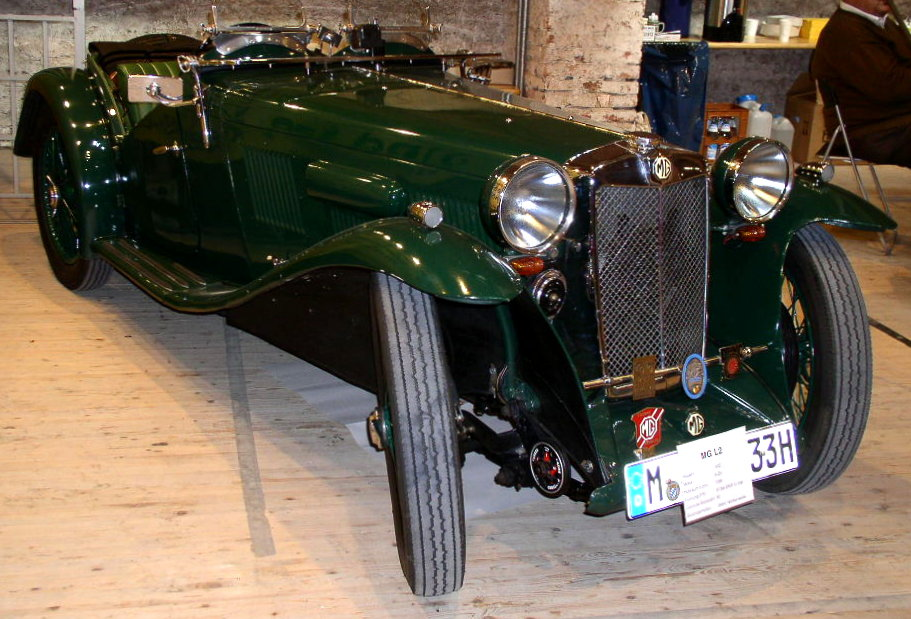
MG L2

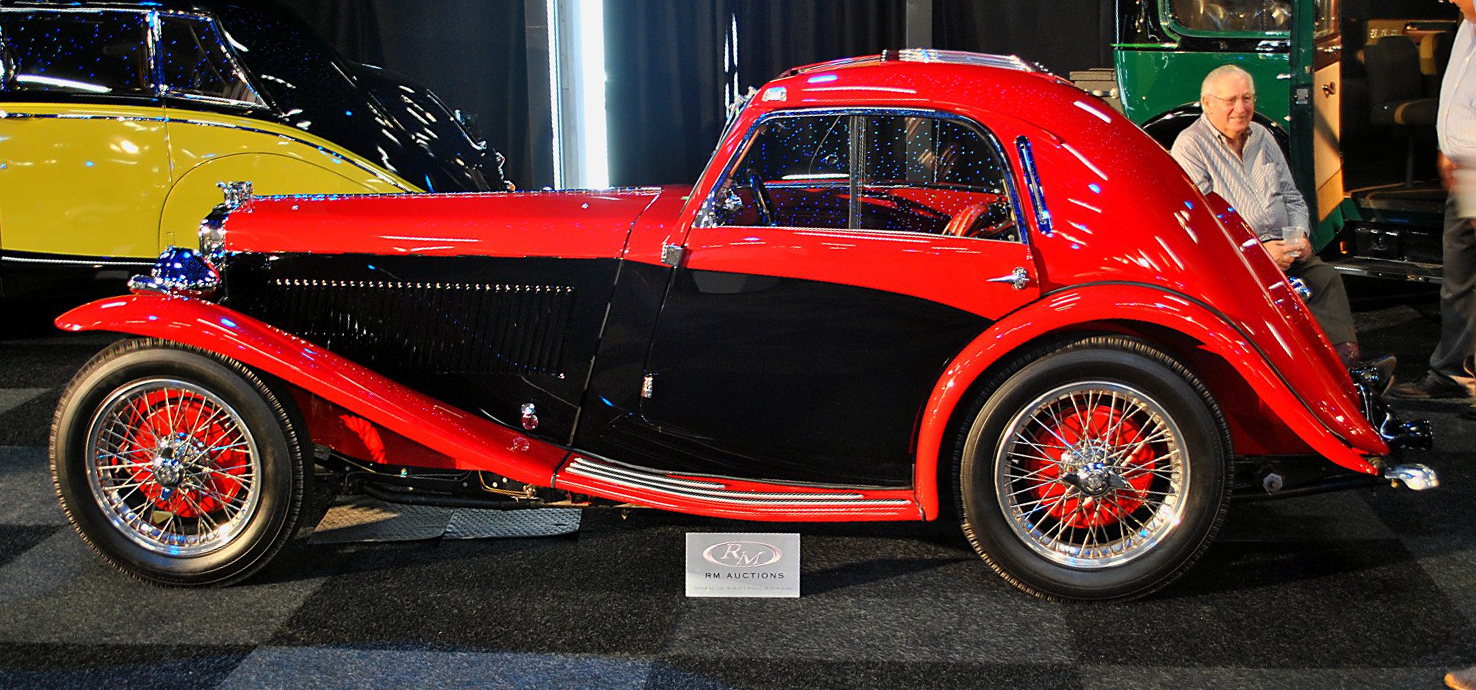
MG Magnette
'Airline' Coupé

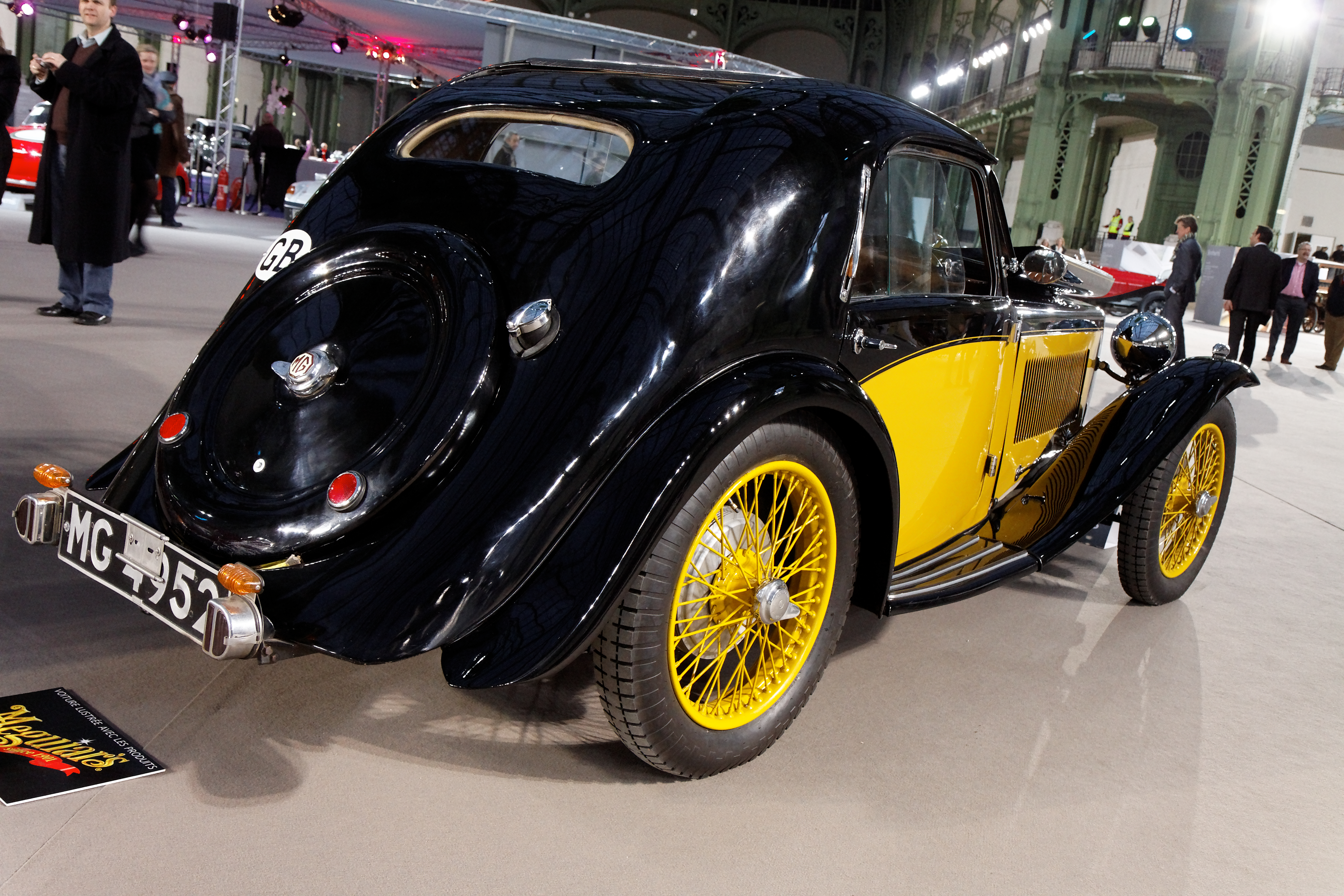
MG Midget TA
'Airline' Coupé

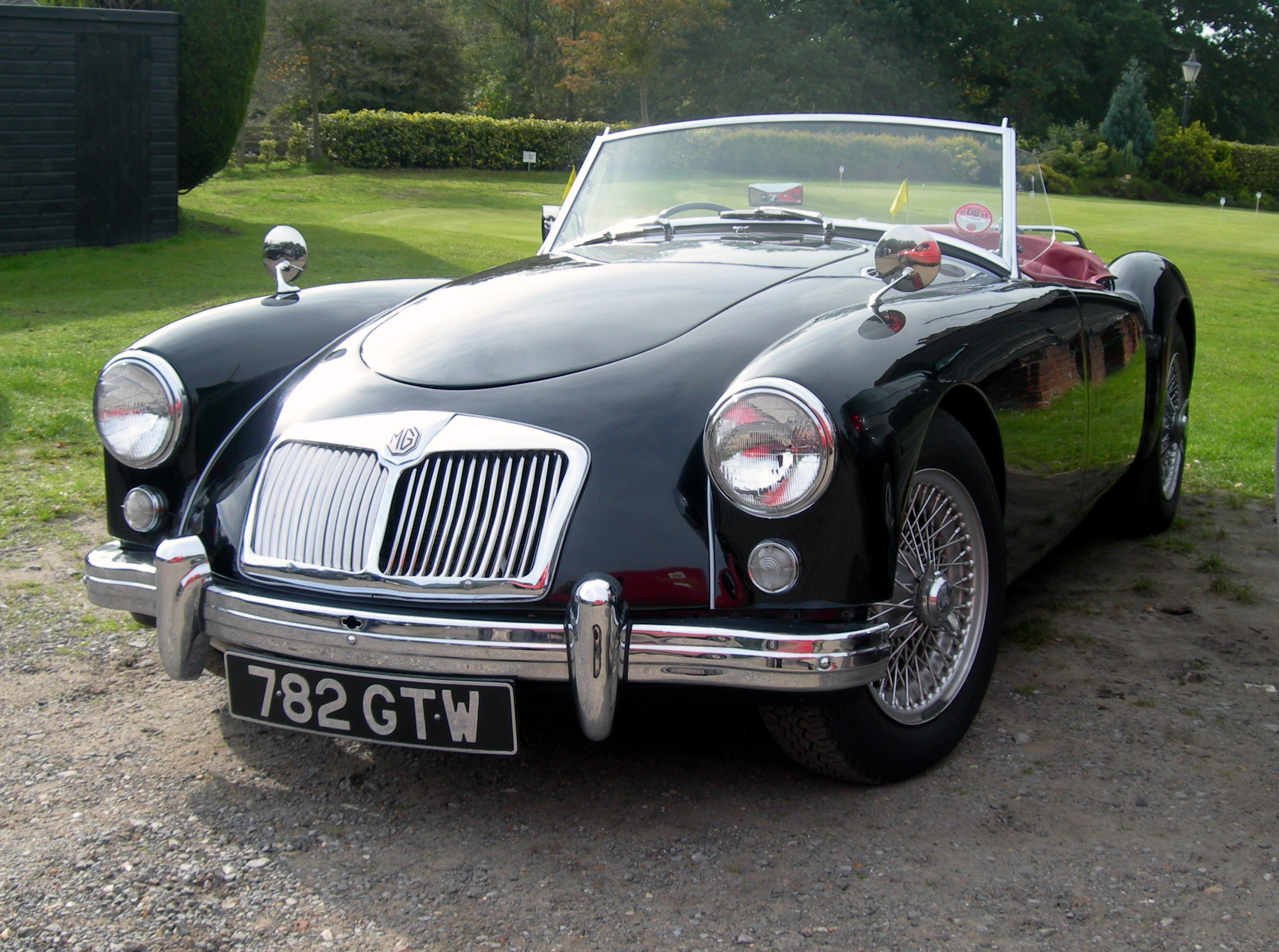
1956 MG A

=== Carbodies' prewar sports bodies ===
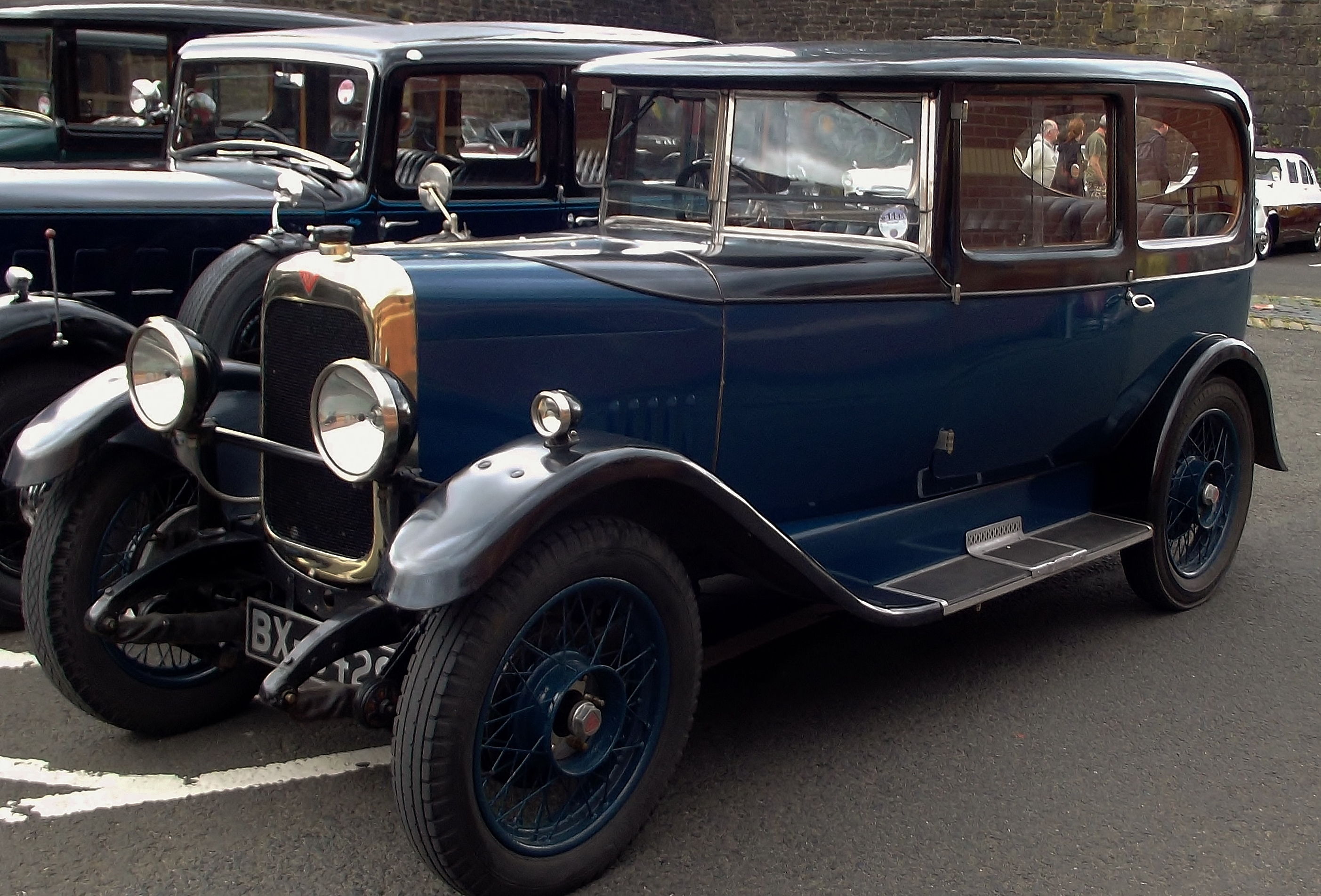
Alvis 12/50 Sportsman's Saloon

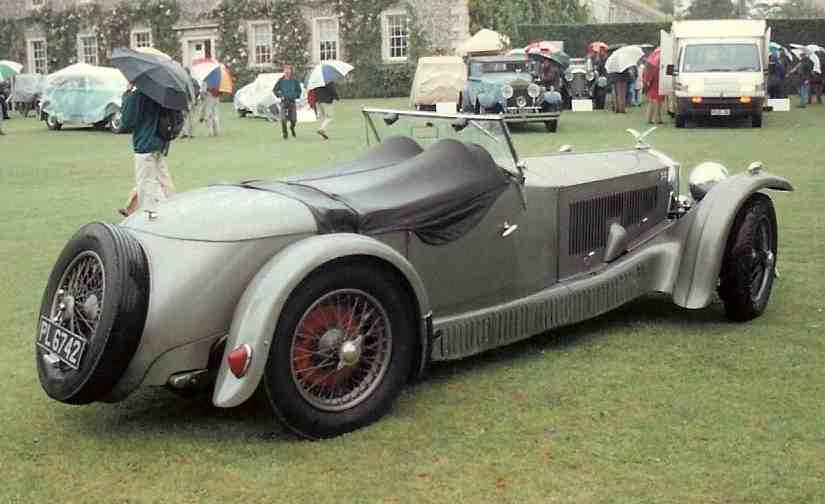
Invicta low chassis 2-seat sports 1931

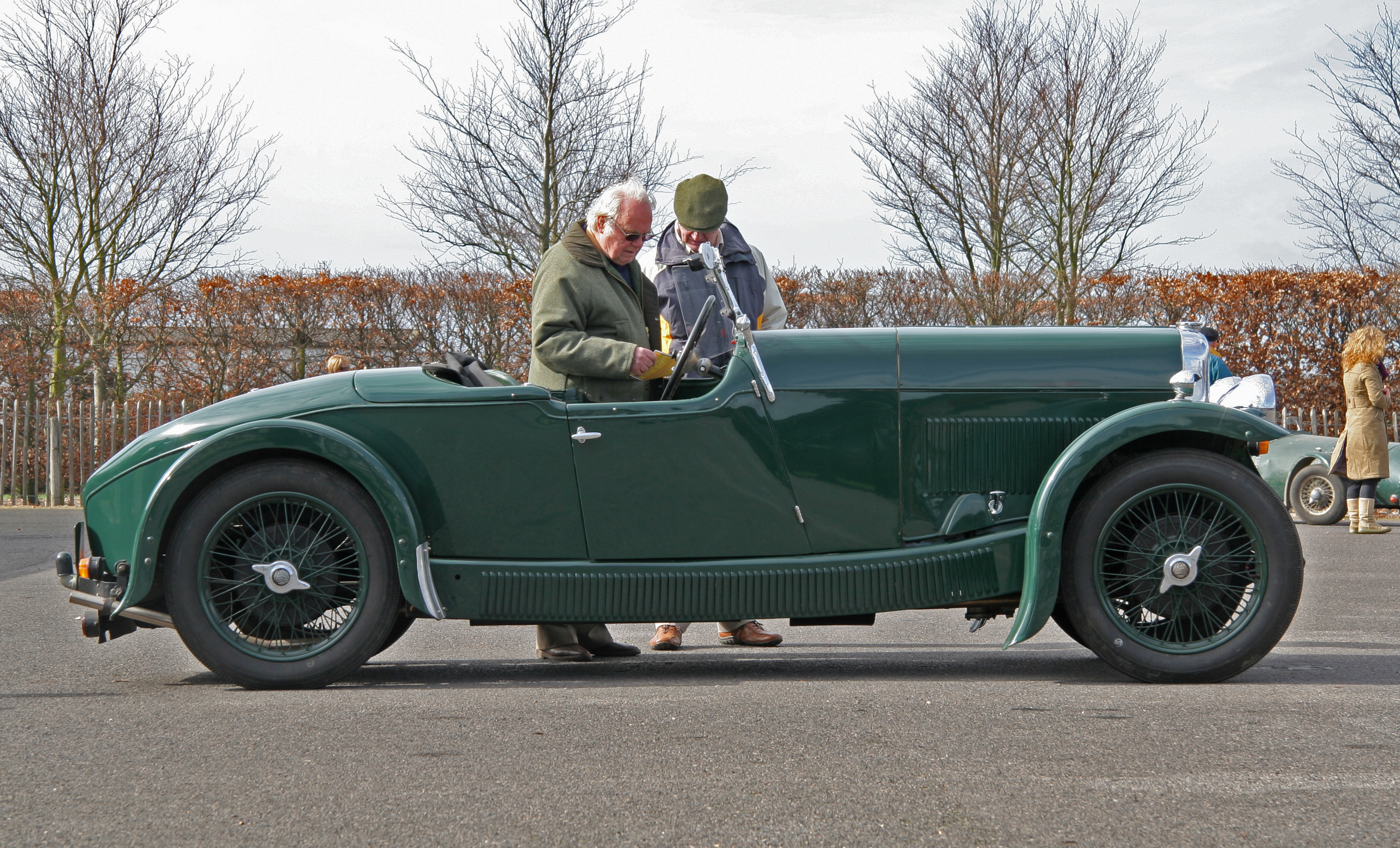
Alvis 12/60 2-seat sports

=== Carbodies' postwar drophead coupés and estate cars ===
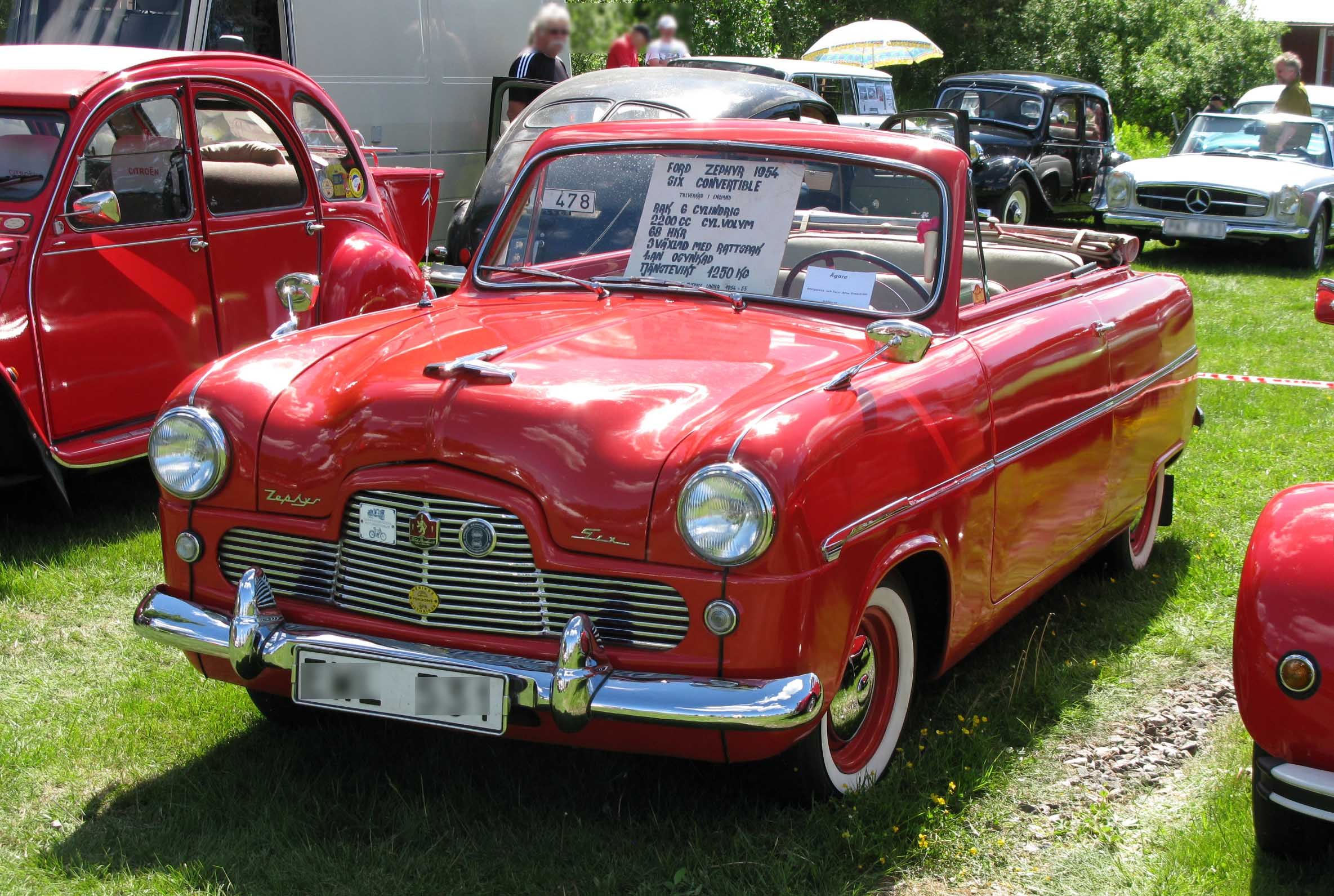
Ford Zephyr convertible

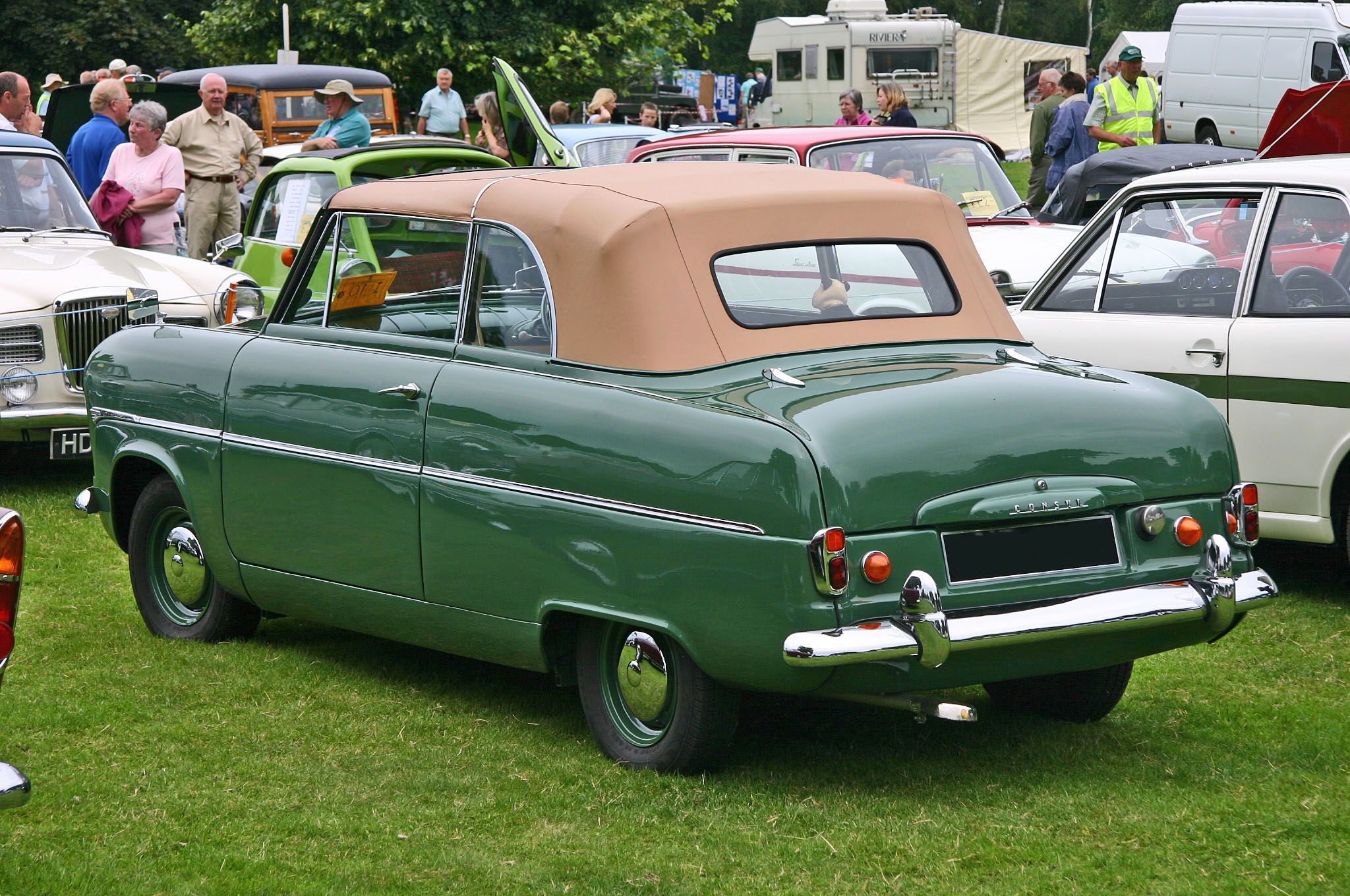
Ford Consul convertible

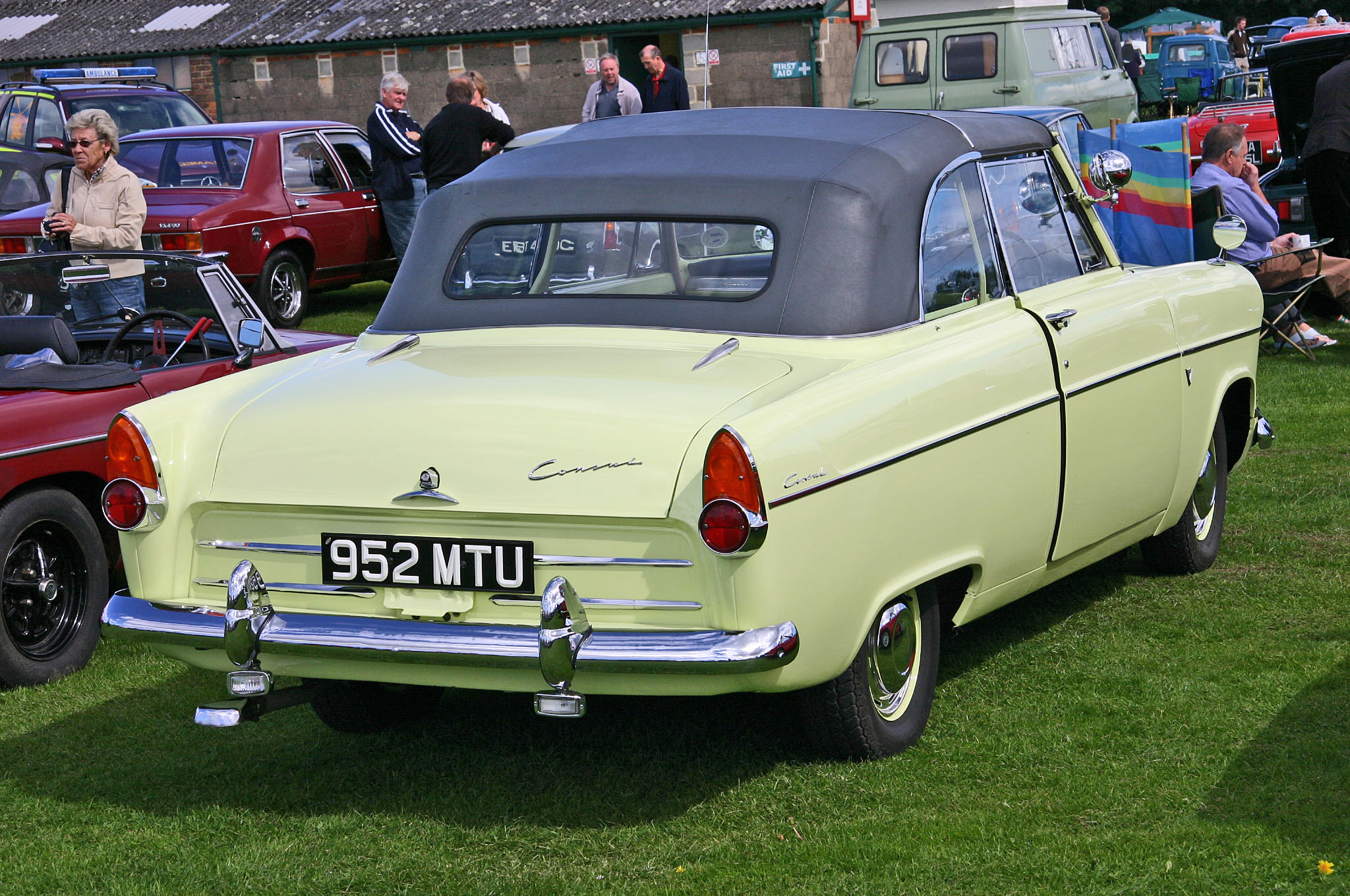
Ford Consul MkII convertible

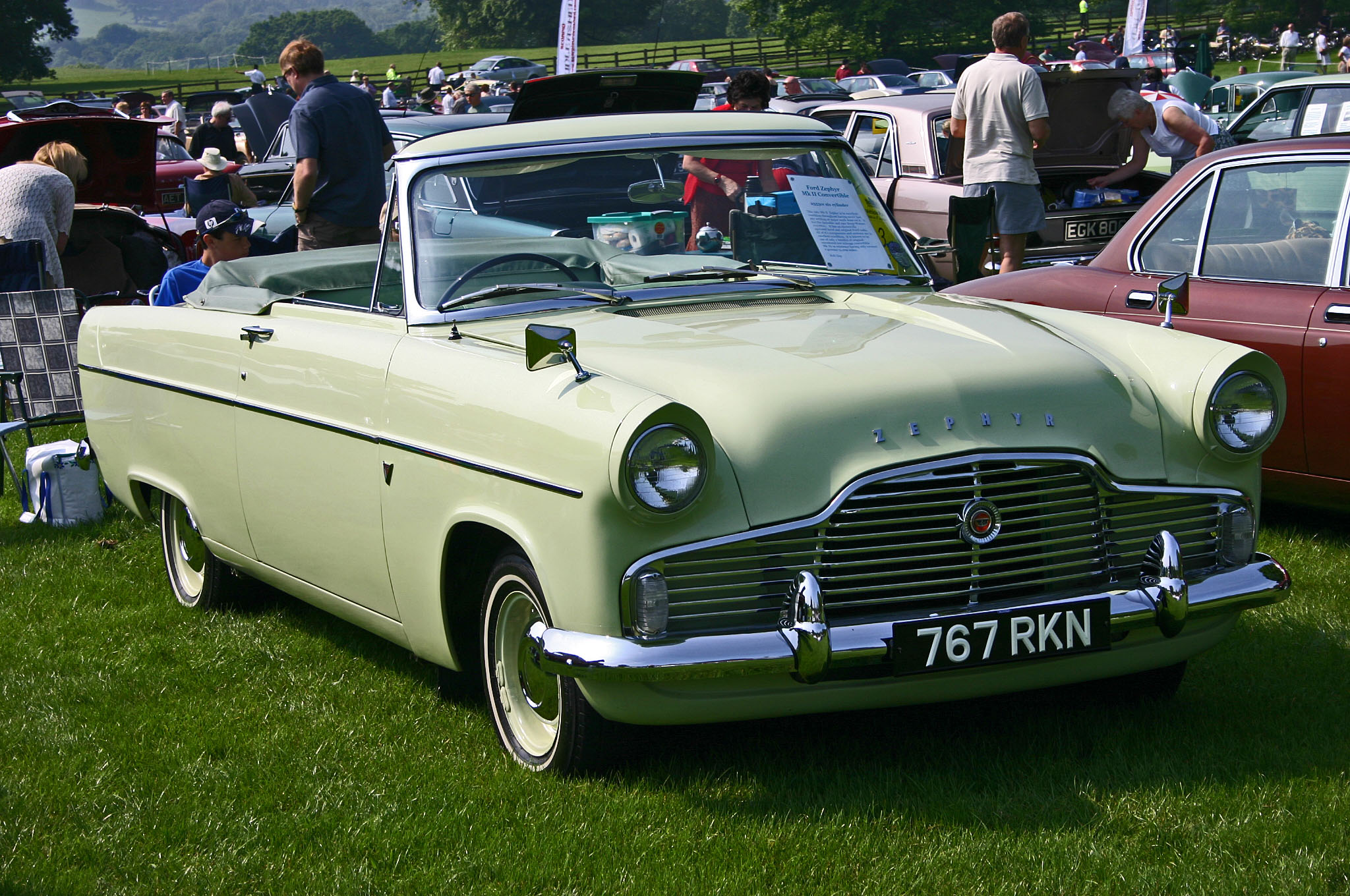
Ford Zephyr MkII convertible

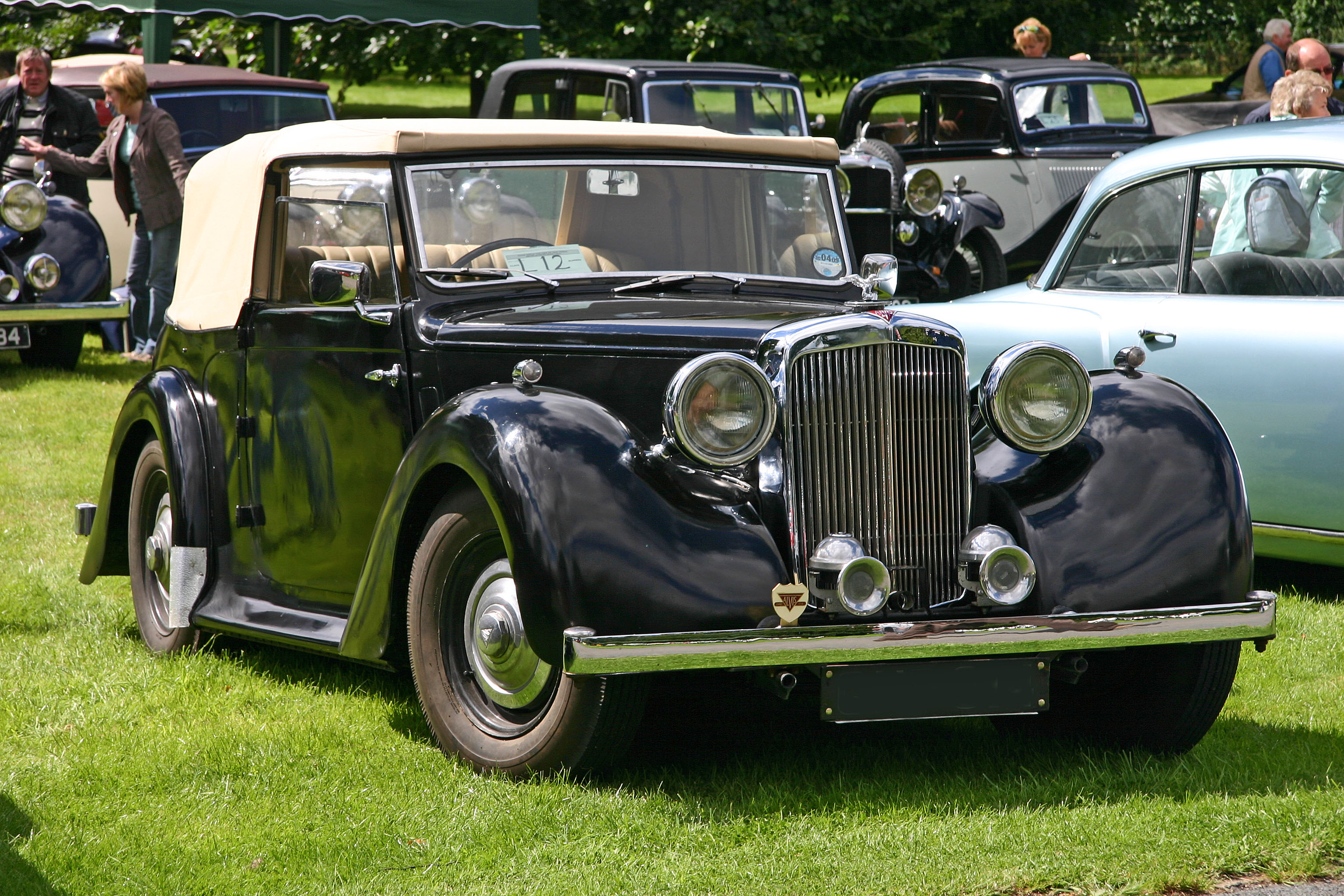
Alvis TA 14 drophead coupé

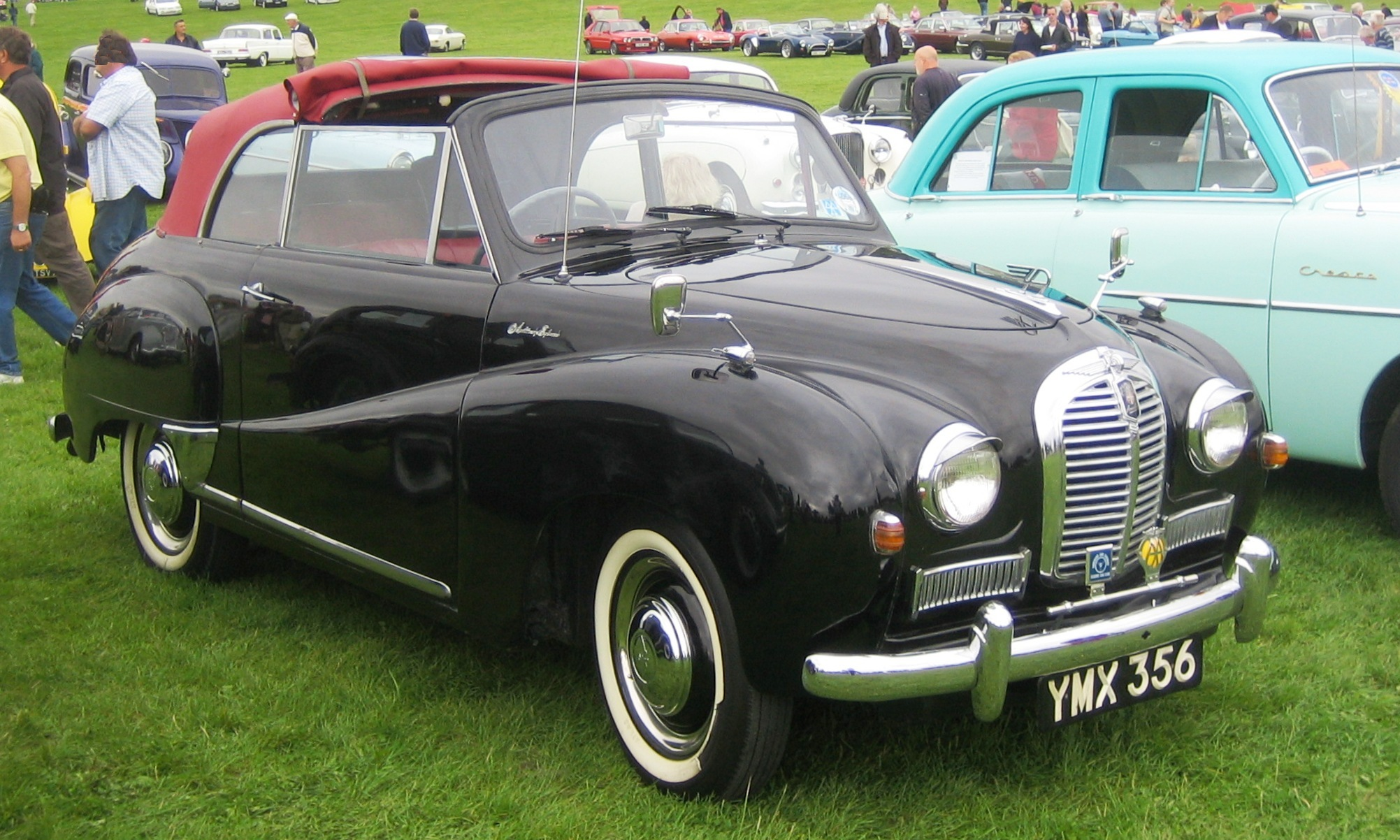
Austin Somerset drophead coupé

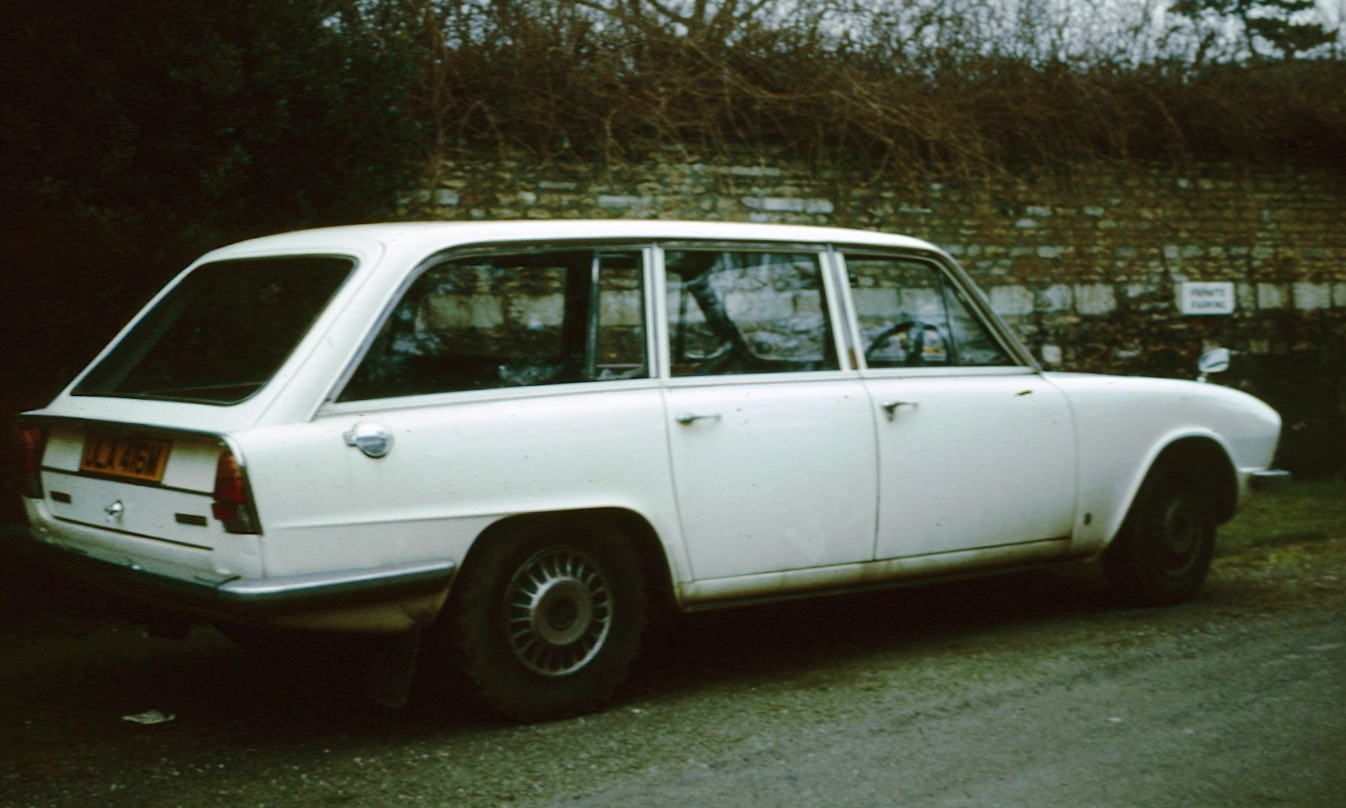
Triumph 2000 Estate

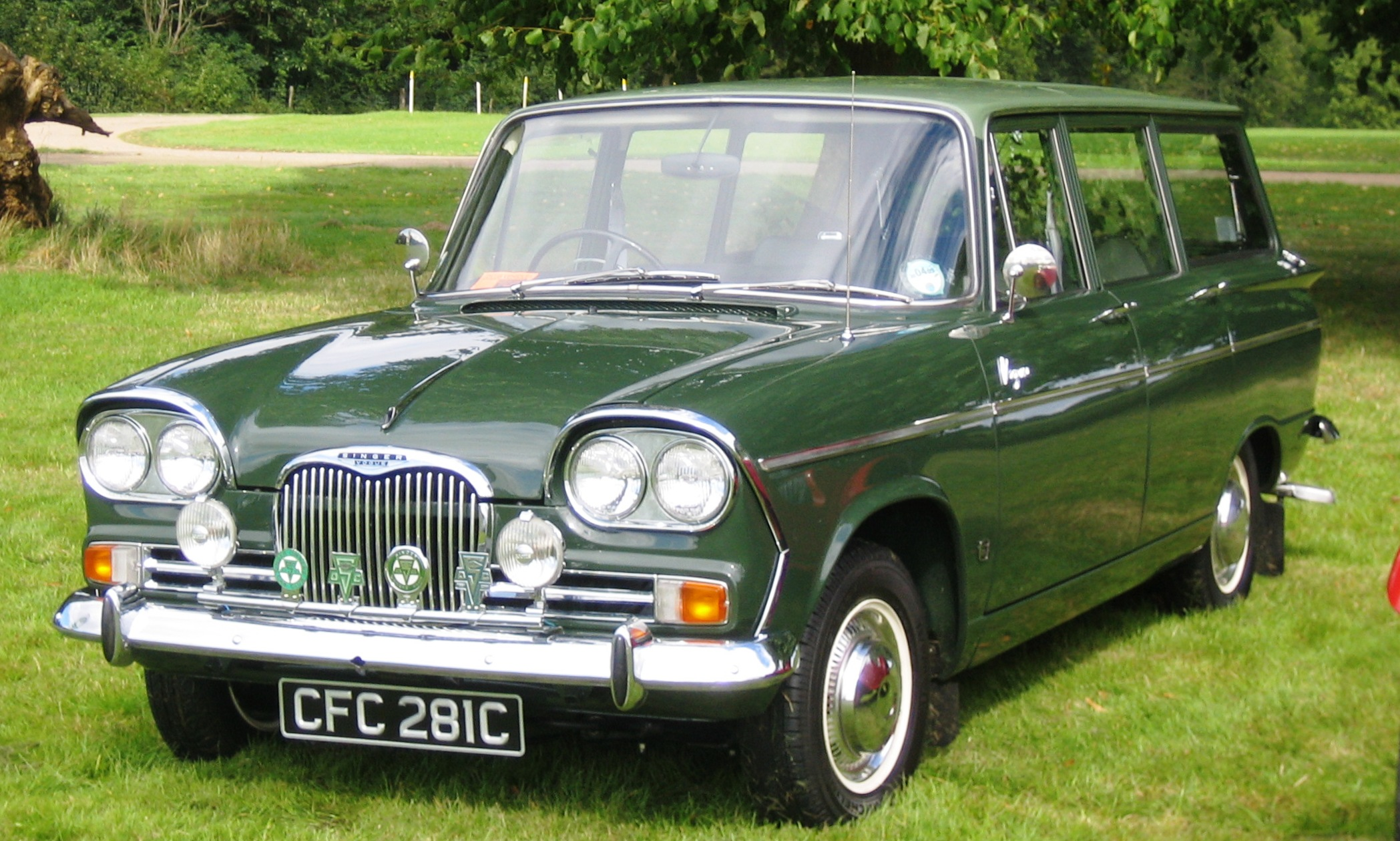
Singer Vogue Estate

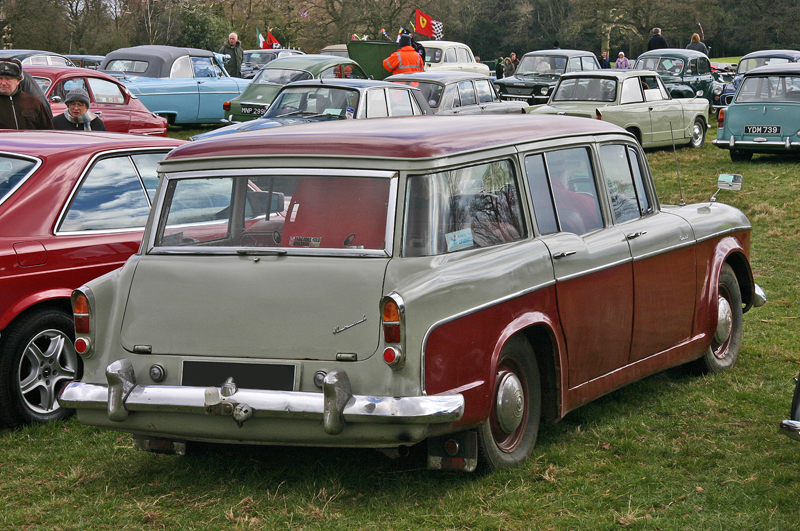
Humber Hawk Estate

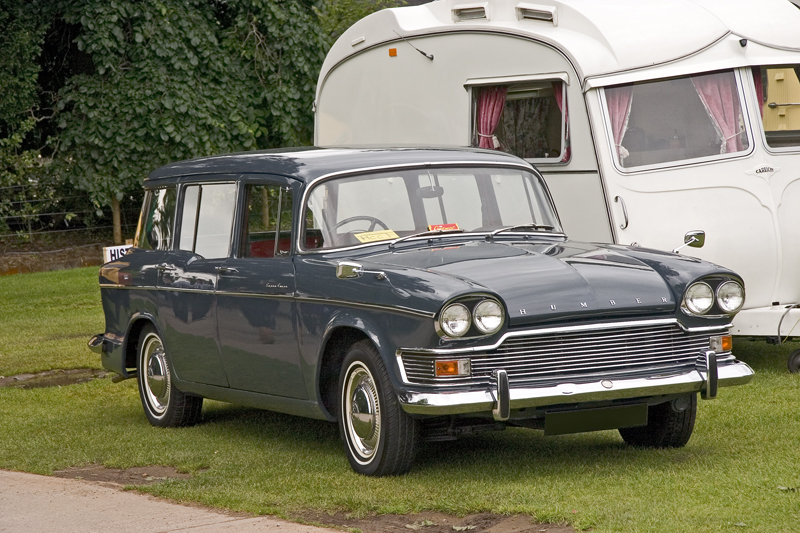
Humber Super Snipe Estate

=== Carbodies' Daimlers ===
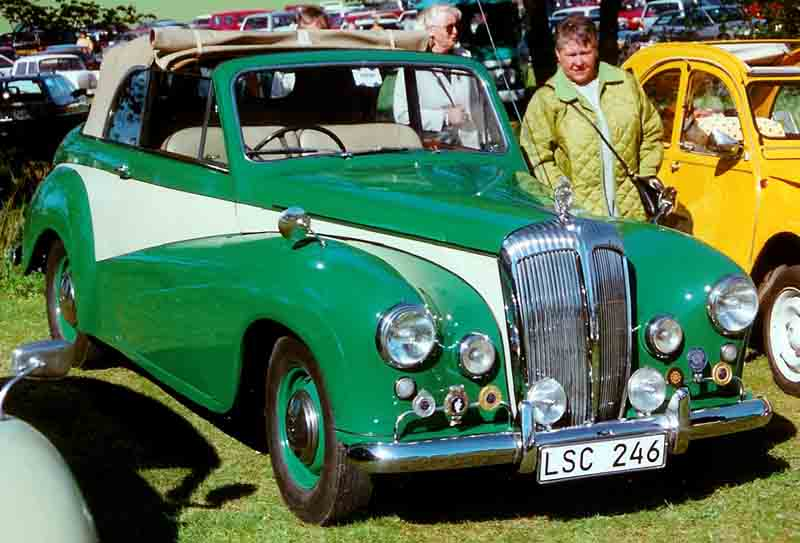
Daimler Conquest drophead coupé

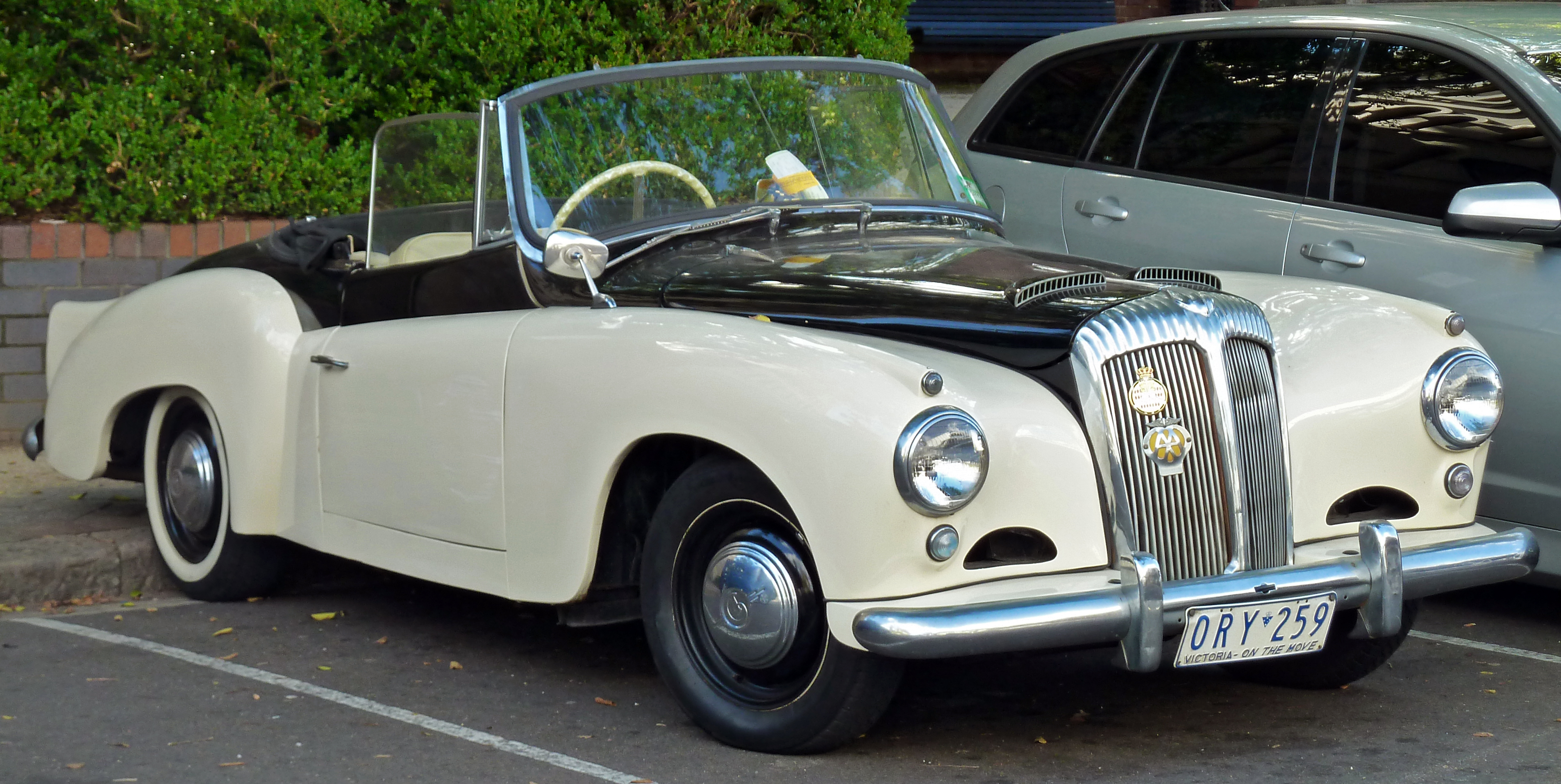
Daimler Conquest Century Roadster Drophead Coupé 1955-1957

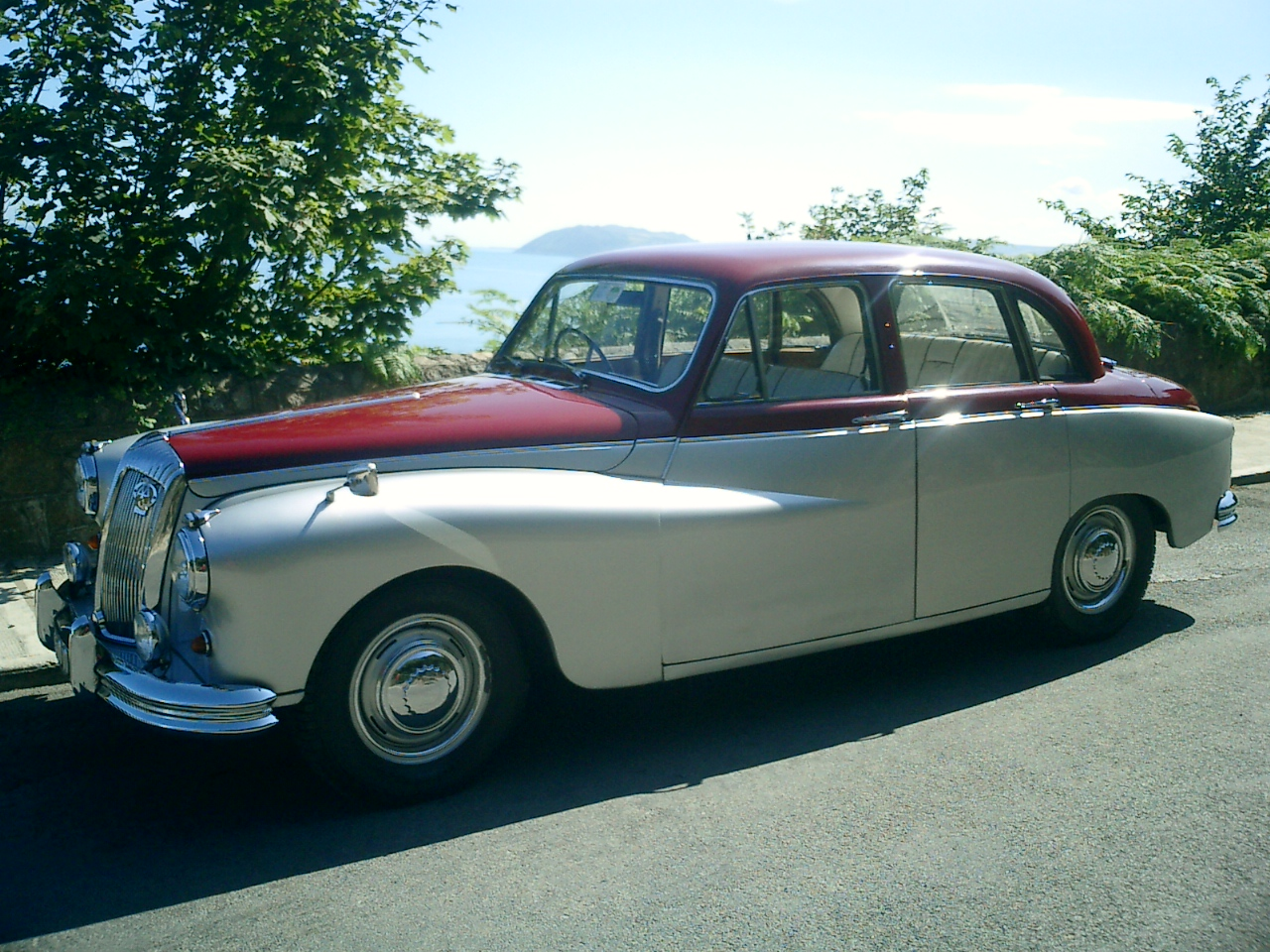
Daimler Majestic

Daimler Majestic Major

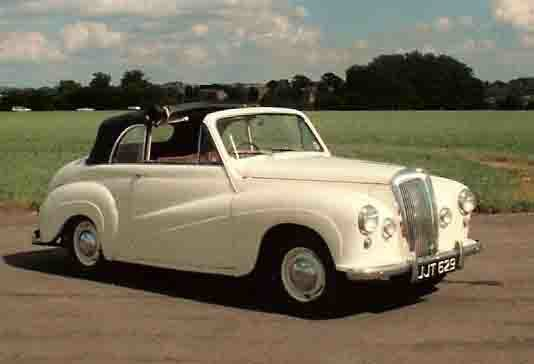
Daimler Conquest Century Drophead Coupé

=== Carbodies' taxis, hire cars and commercial vehicles ===
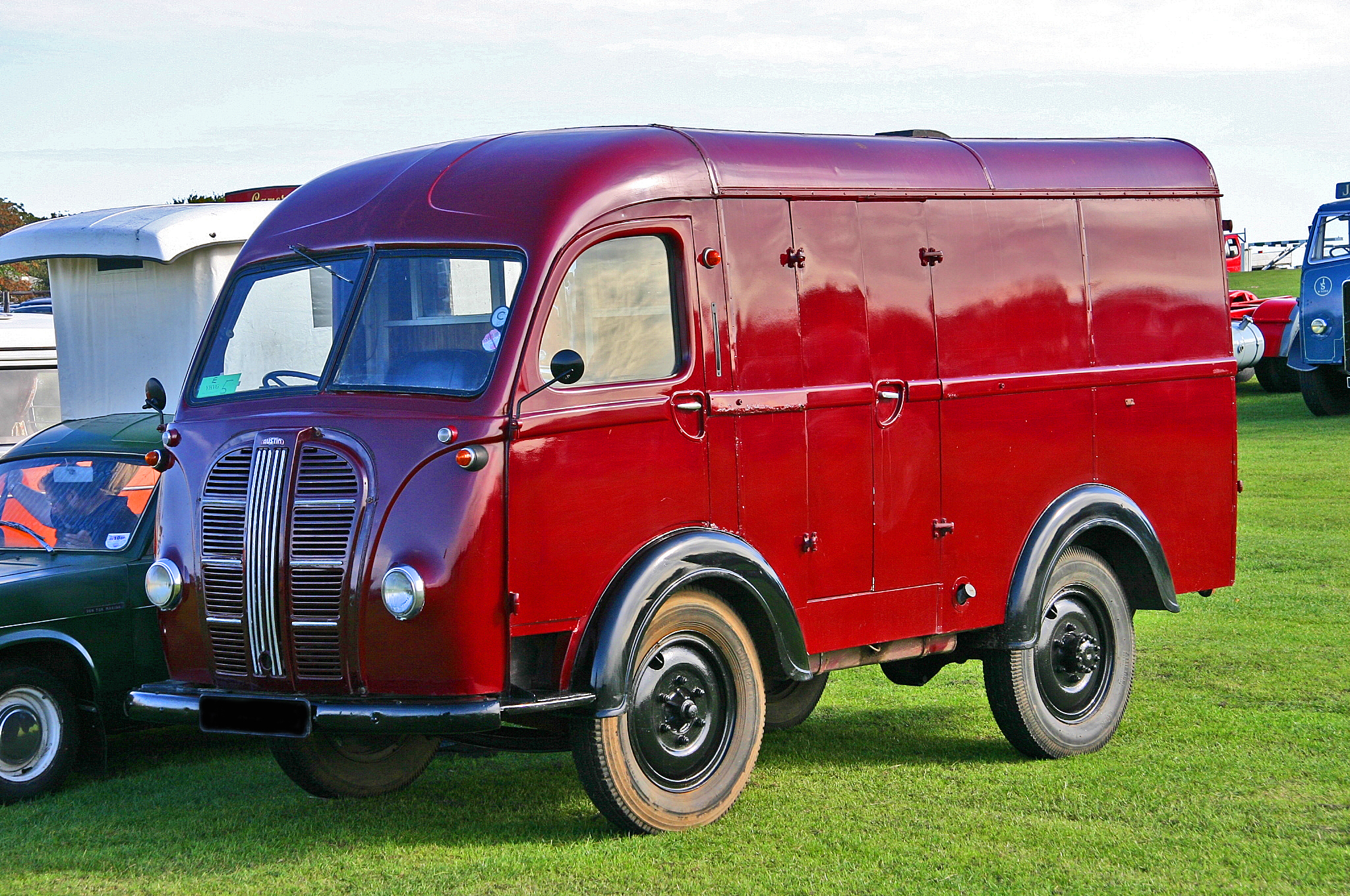
Austin K8

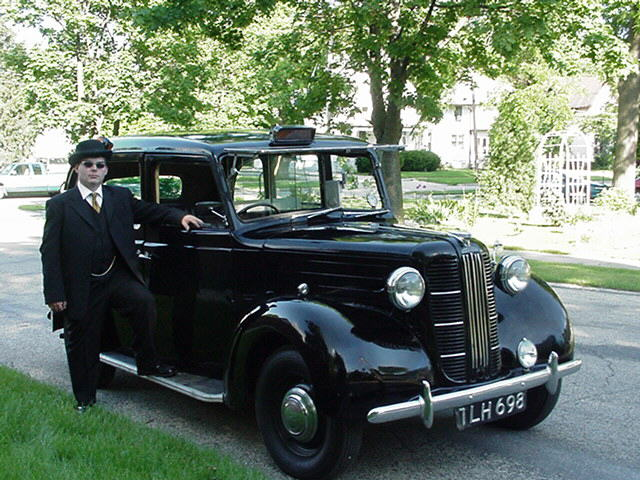
Austin taxicab FX3

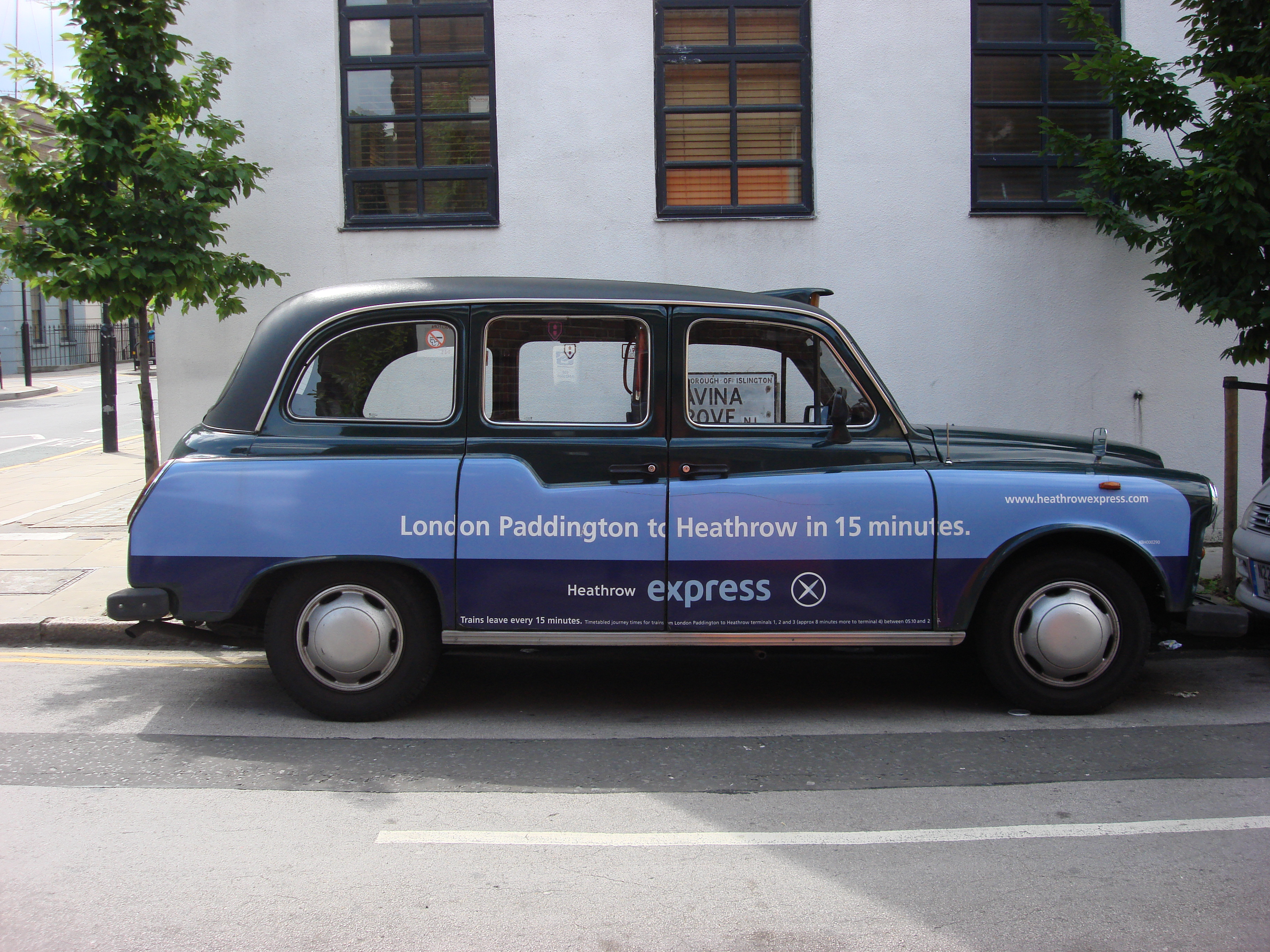
Carbodies taxicab FX4

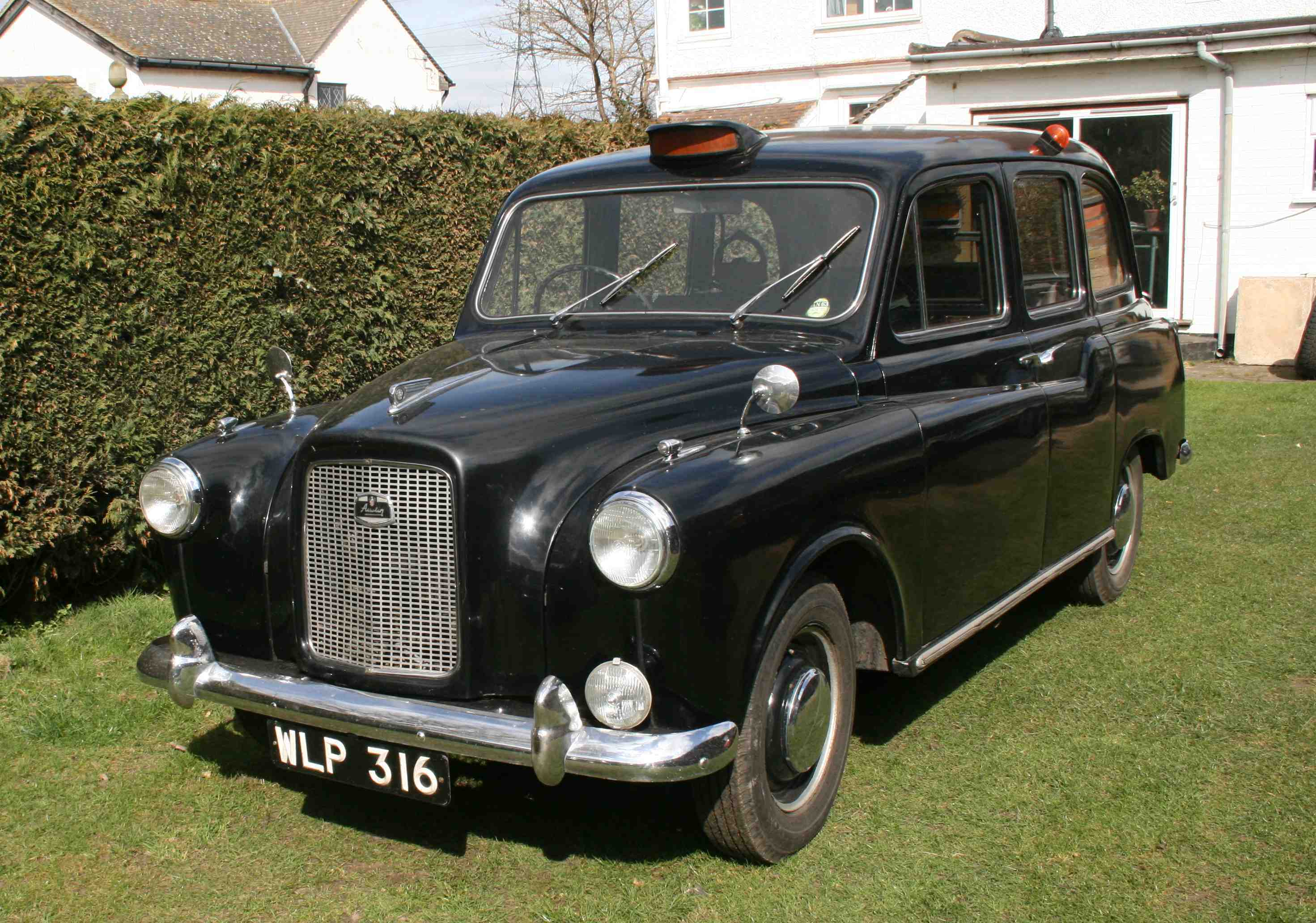
Austin FX4 1962

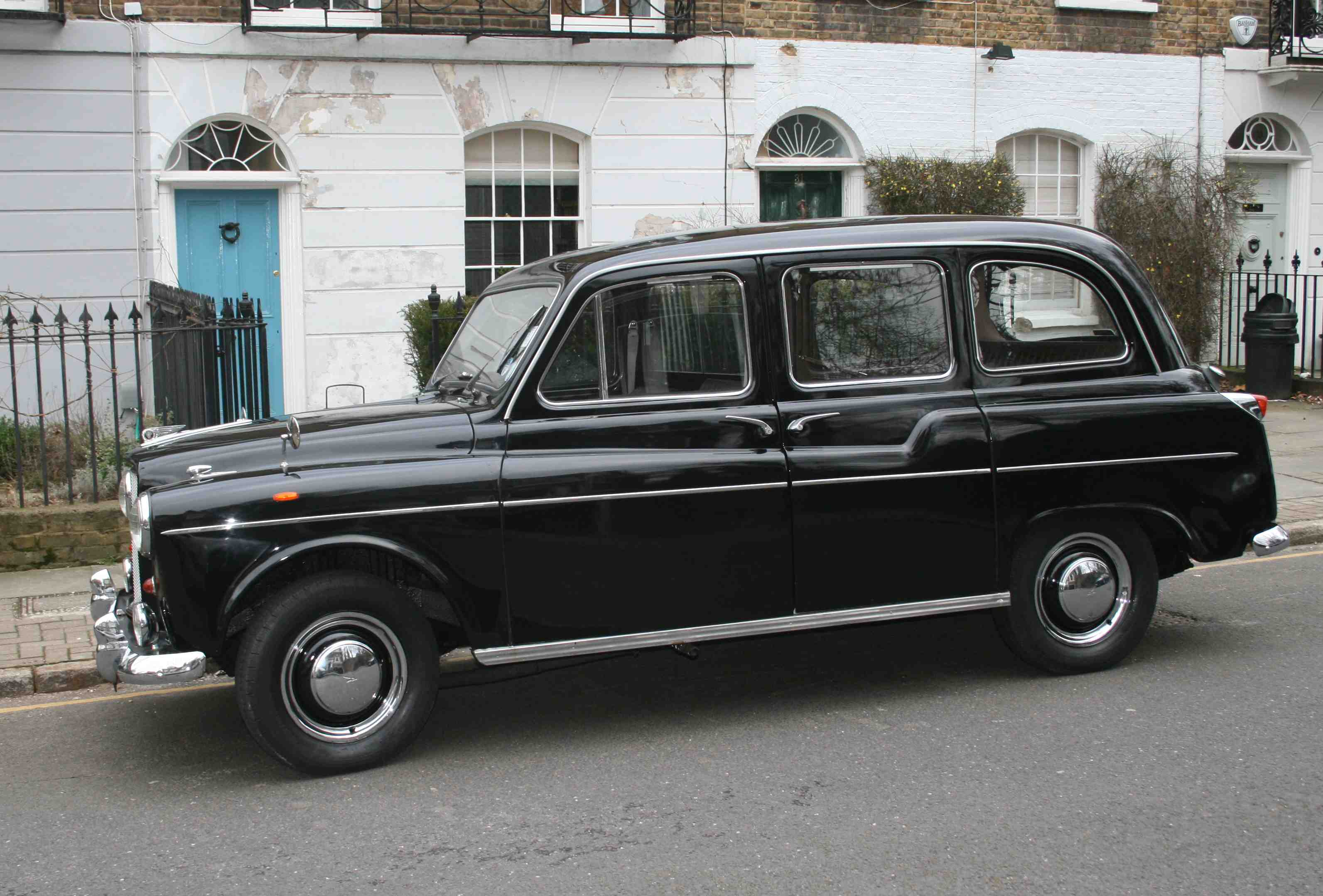
1965 Austin FL2 Hire Car

=== LTI taxis ===
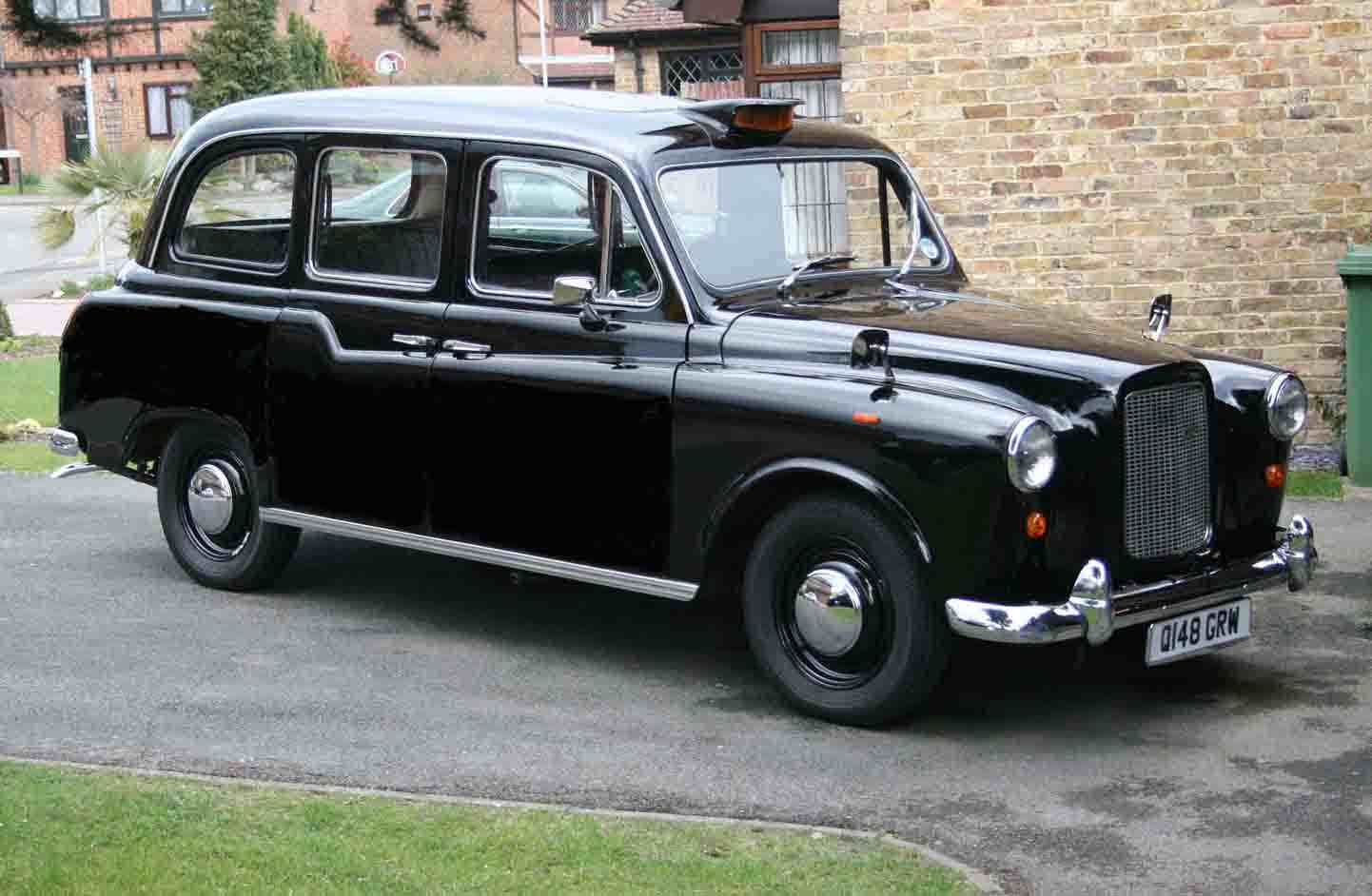
1985 Austin FX4Q taxi

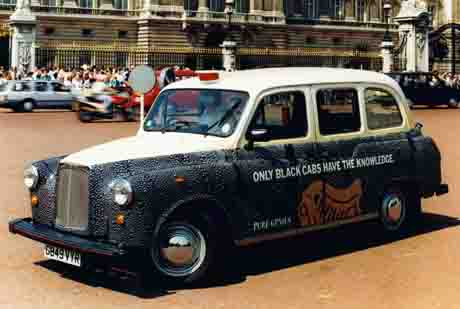
1990 Fairway in Guinness livery

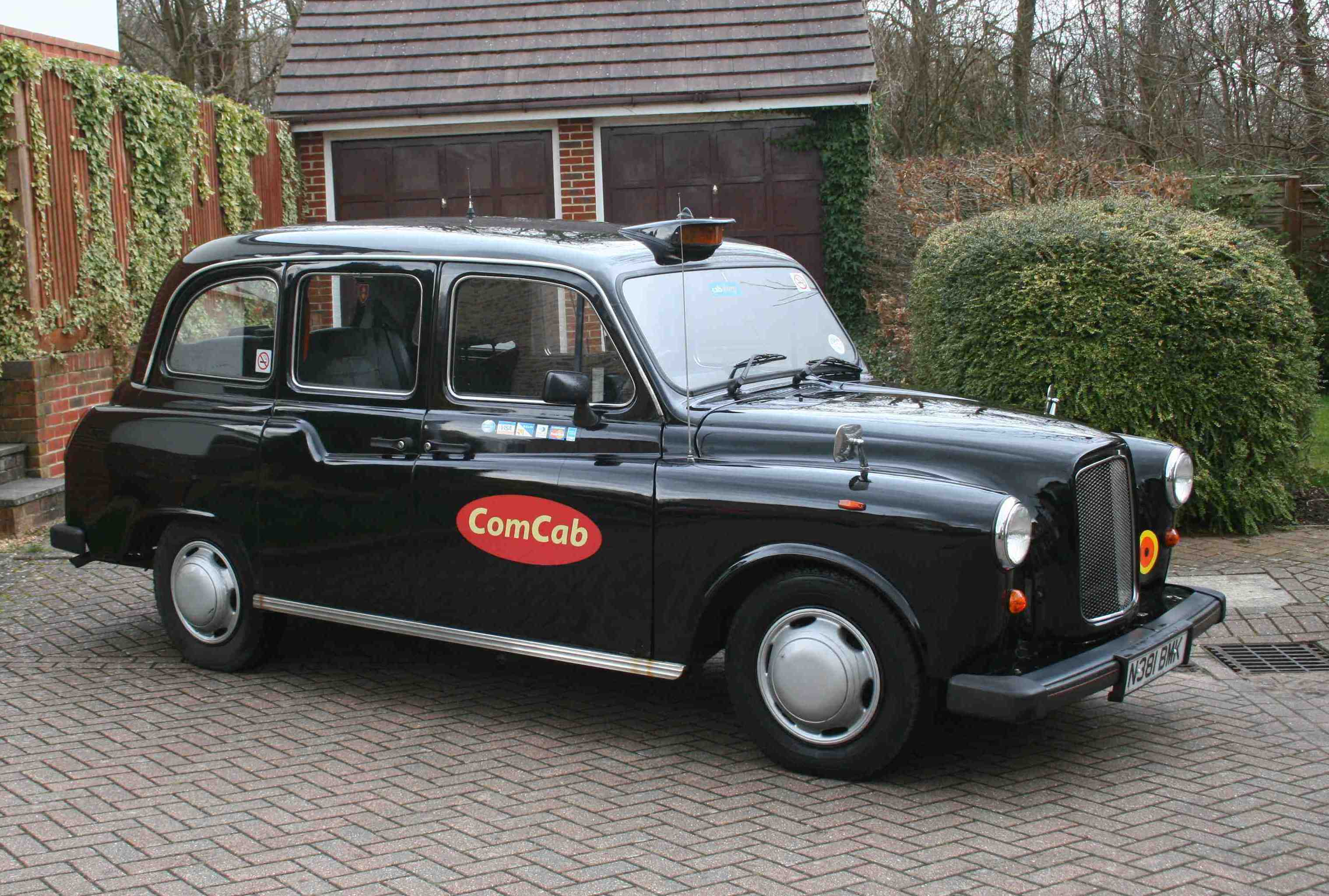
1995 Fairway 95 London taxi

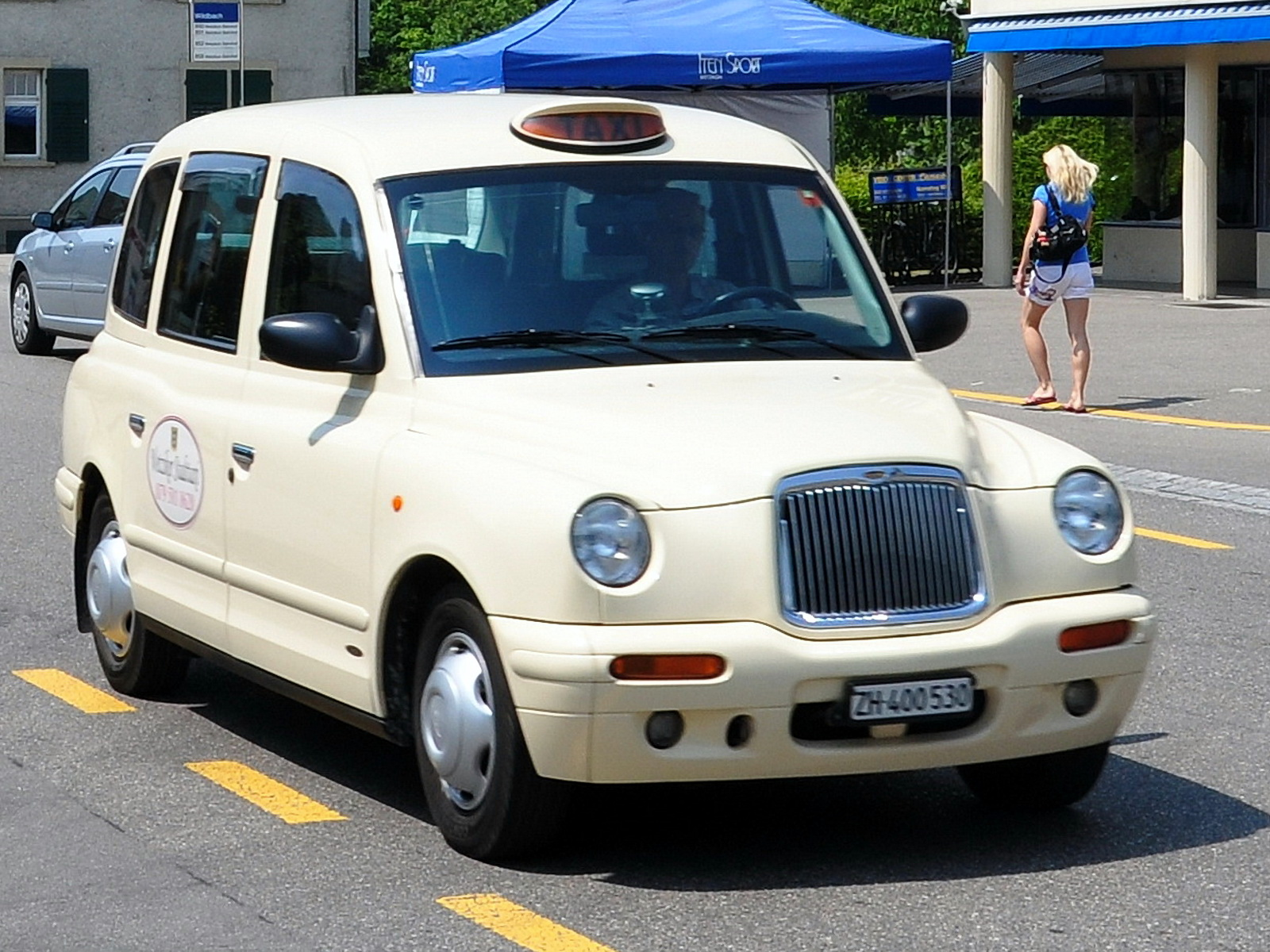
TXII in Switzerland

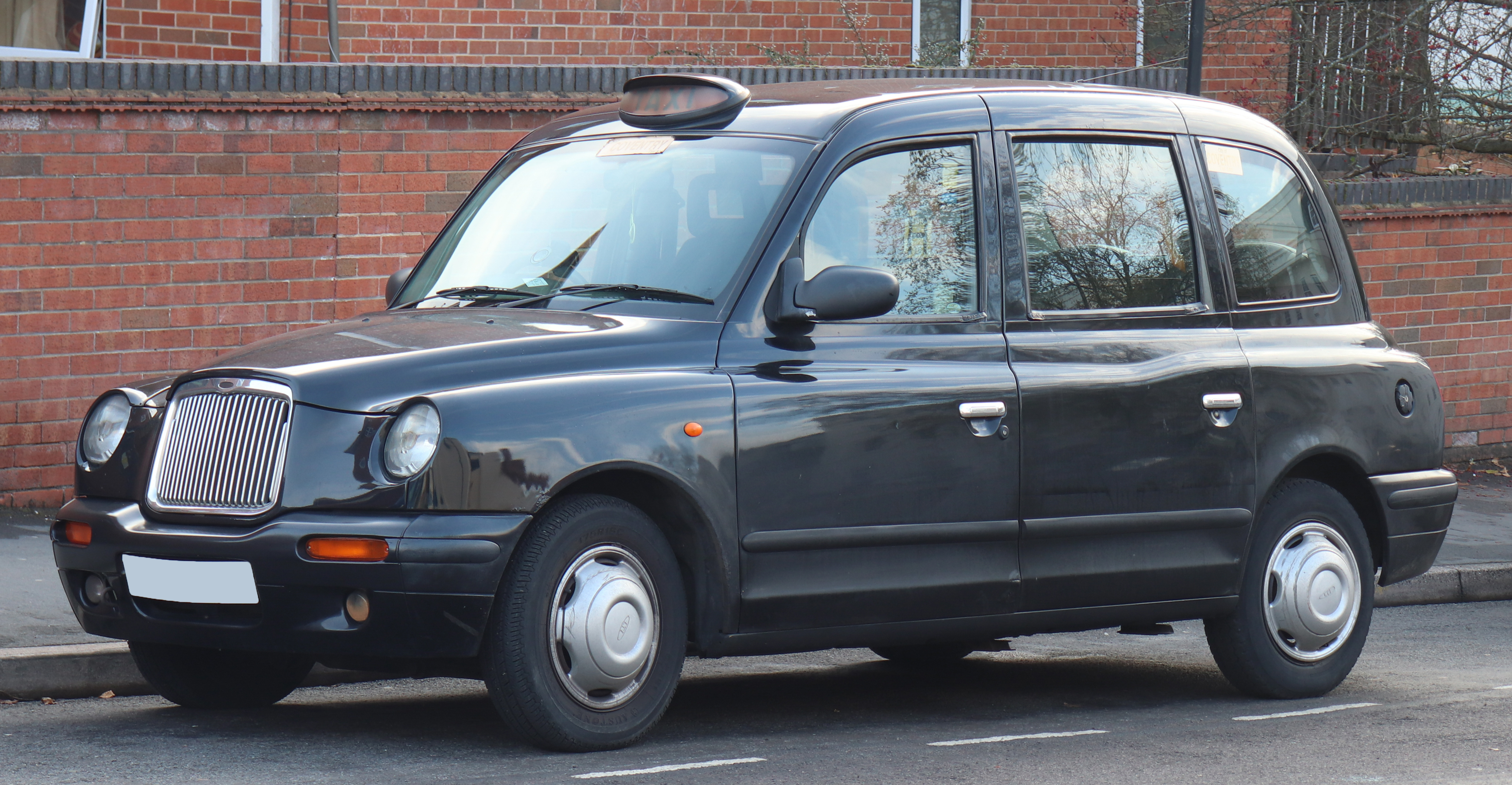
TXII in United Kingdom

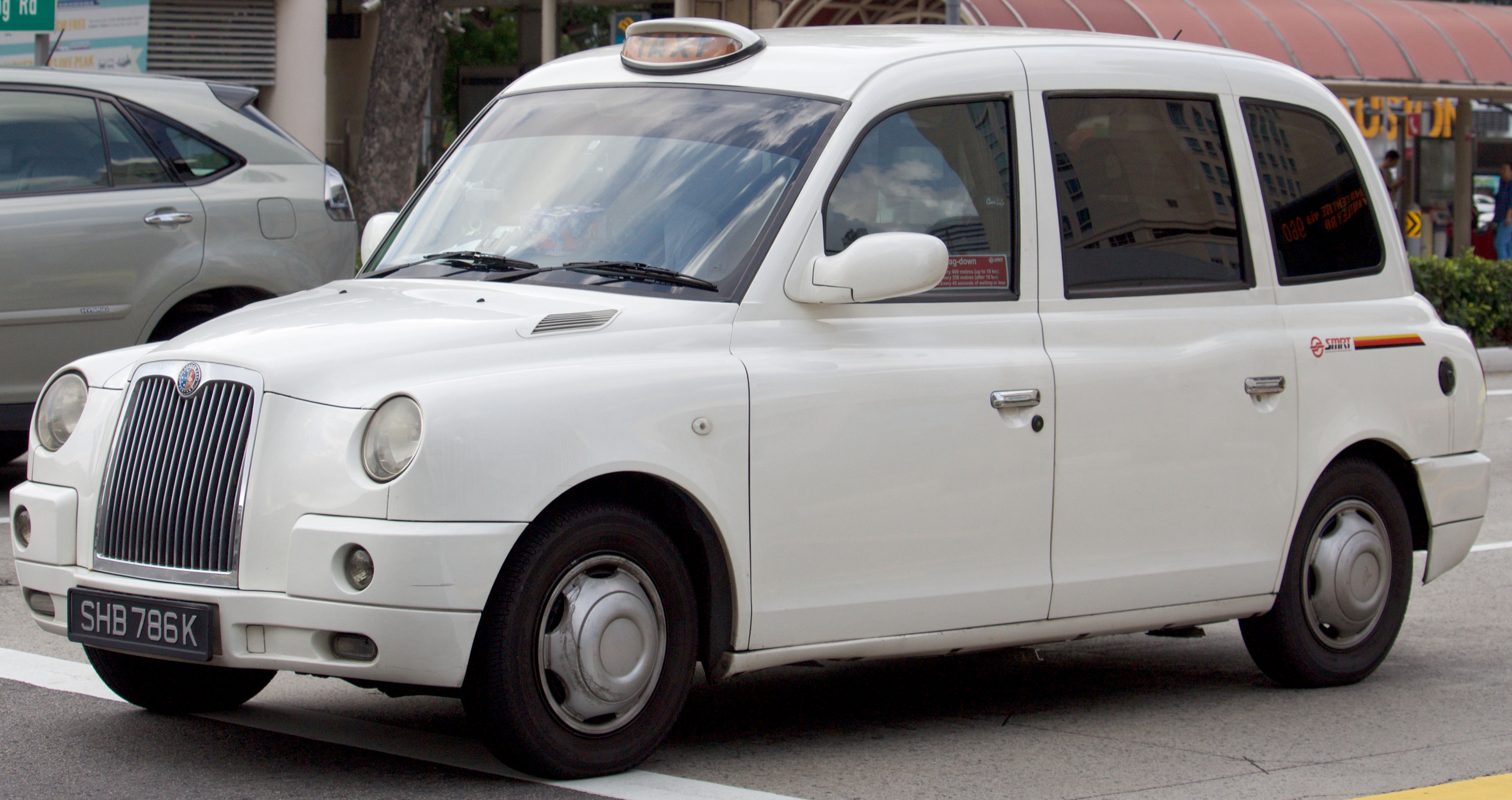
TX4 in Singapore

== See also ==
- Taxicabs of the United Kingdom
