= MG M-type =

Sports car produced by MG Cars (1929–1932)

MG M-type "Midget"
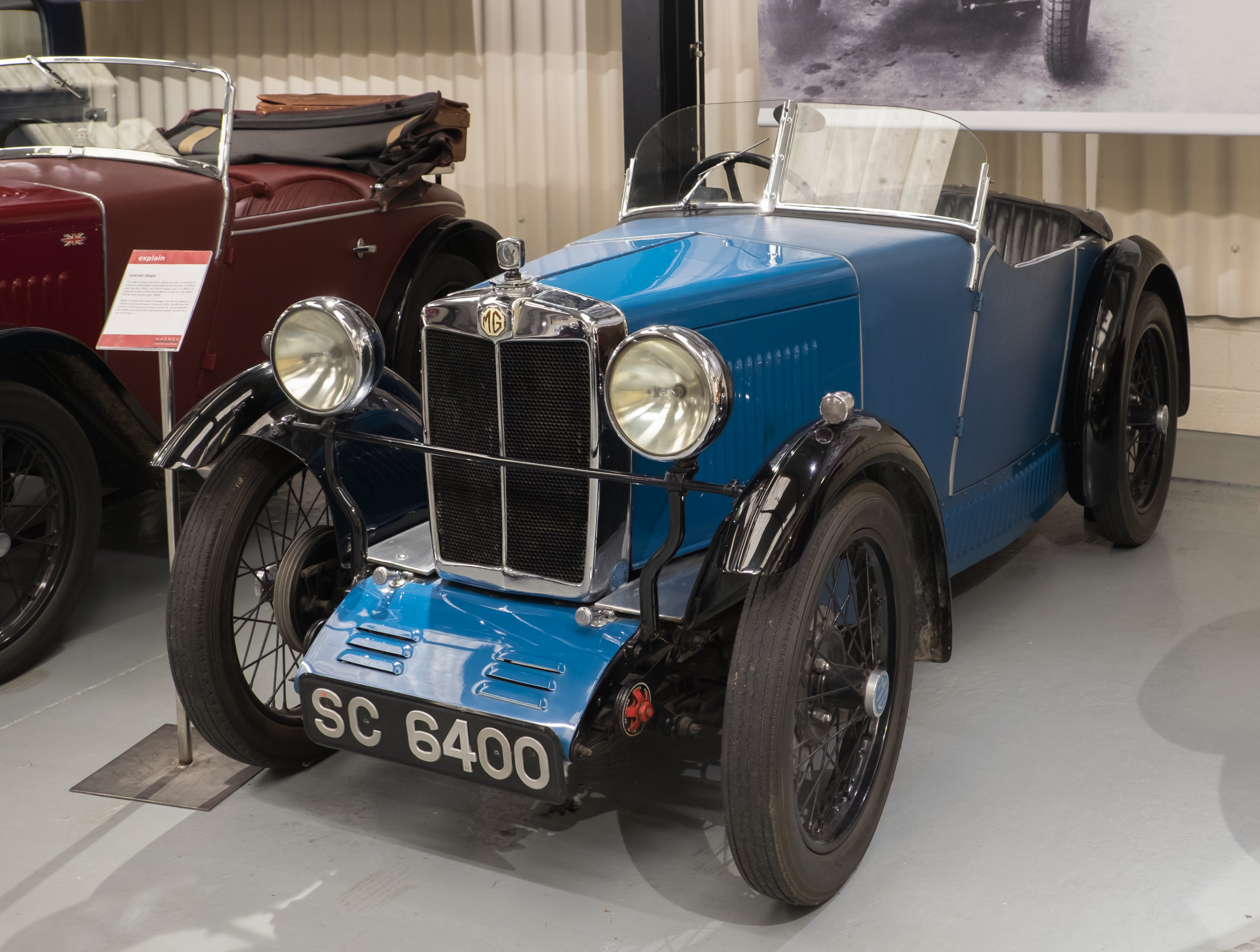

Overview
- Manufacturer: MG
- Production: 1929–1932
- Assembly: Cowley, Oxford, England (1929–1930); Abingdon-on-Thames, Berkshire, England (1930–1932)

Body and chassis
- Class: Sports car
- Body style: 2-door Roadster; Coupe

Chronology
- Predecessor: none
- Successor: MG J-type

The MG M-type (also known as the MG Midget) is a sports car that was produced by MG Cars from April 1929 until 1932. It was sometimes referred to as the 8/33. Launched at the 1928 London Motor Show when sales of larger MG saloons was faltering due to the economic climate, the small car brought MG ownership to a new sector of the market and probably saved the company. Early cars were made in the Cowley factory, but from 1930, production had transferred to Abingdon.

== Sports car ==
The M-Type was one of the first affordable sports cars to be offered by an established manufacturer, as opposed to modified versions of factory-built saloon cars and tourers. By offering a car with an accessible driving experience at a low price (the new MG cost less than double the cheapest version of the Morris Minor on which it was based) despite relatively low overall performance, the M-type set the template for many of the MG products that were to follow, as well as many of the other famous British sports cars of the 20th century. The M-type was also the first MG to wear the Midget name that would be used on a succession of small sports cars until 1980.

This 2-door sports car used an updated version of the four-cylinder bevel-gear driven overhead camshaft engine used in the 1928 Morris Minor and Wolseley 10 with a single SU carburettor giving 20 bhp (15 kW) at 4000 rpm. Drive was to the rear wheels through a three-speed non-synchromesh gearbox. The chassis was based on the one used in the 1928 Morris Minor with lowered suspension using half-elliptic springs and Hartford friction disk shock absorbers with rigid front and rear axles and bolt on wire wheels. The car had a wheelbase of 78 inches (1980 mm) and a track of 42 inches (1067 mm).

While the braking system of the Morris Minor used bare wire cables with pulleys at the front to enable the cables to be routed so as to pull the brake levers (which were behind and below the axle) forward, the M.G. M Type used rods and Bowden cables to operate the front brakes and Bowden cables, but no rods, to operate the back brakes. The M initially retained the transmission brake.

1930 brought a series of improvements to the car. The rod and Bowden cable brake system, with the handbrake working on the transmission, was replaced by a full Bowden cable system - without the rods - and with the cross shaft coupled to the handbrake and the transmission brake deleted. Engine output was increased to 27 bhp (20 kW) by improving the camshaft and a four-speed gearbox was offered as an option. The doors became front-hinged. A supercharged version could be ordered from 1932, raising the top speed to 80 mph (130 km/h).

Early bodies were fabric-covered using a wood frame; this changed to all-metal in 1931. Most cars had bodies made by Carbodies of Coventry and fitted by MG in either open two-seat or closed two-door "Sportsmans" coupé versions, but some chassis were supplied to external coachbuilders such as Jarvis. The factory even made a van version as a service vehicle.

The car could reach 65 mph (105 km/h) and return 40 miles per gallon. The open version cost £175 at launch, soon rising to £185, and the coupé cost £245. The 1932 supercharged car cost £250.

The M-type had considerable sporting success, both privately and with official teams winning gold medals in the 1929 Land's End Trial and class wins in the 1930 "Double Twelve" race at Brooklands. An entry was also made in the 1930 Le Mans 24 hour, but neither of the cars finished.

== Gallery ==
MG M-Type advertising

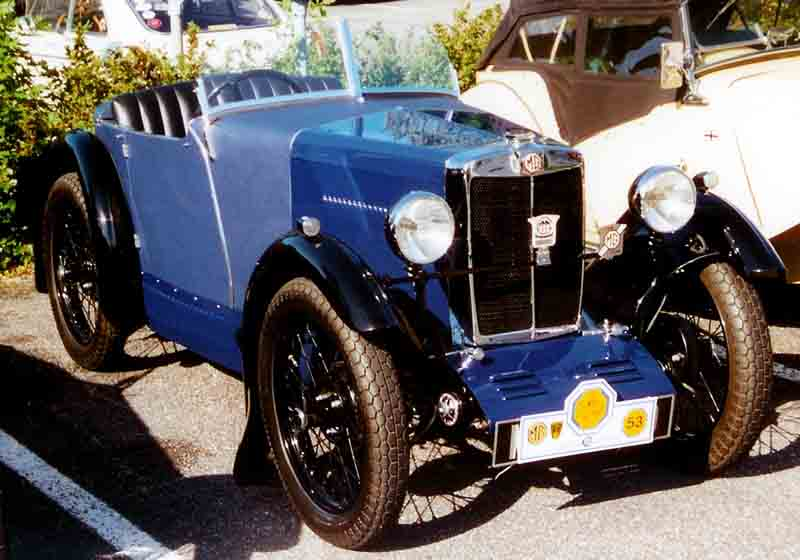
1929 MG M-type Midget 2-Seater Sports

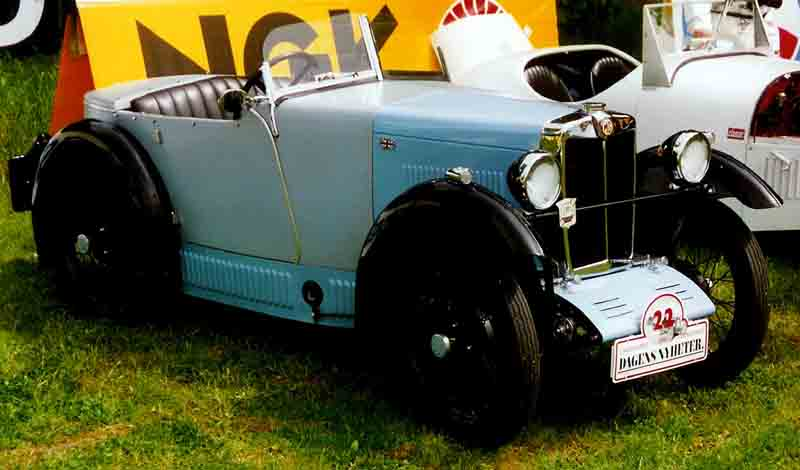
1929 MG M-type Midget 2-Seater Sports

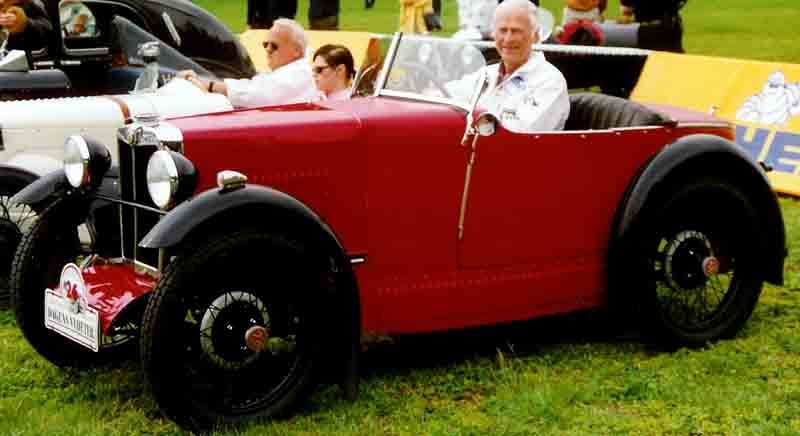
1930 MG M-type Midget 2-Seater Sports

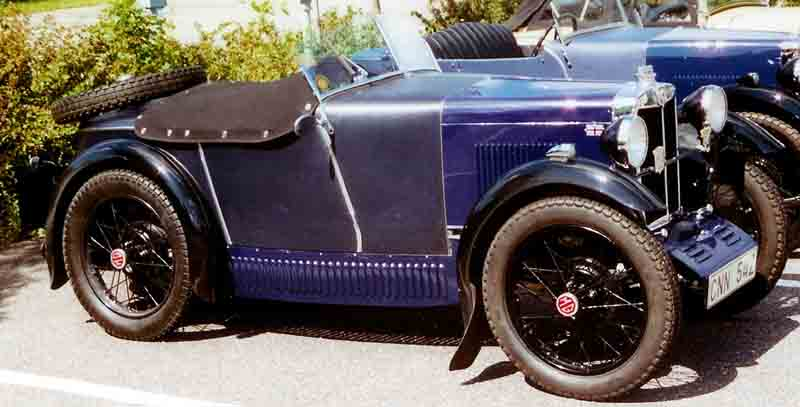
1930 MG M-type Midget 2-Seater Sports

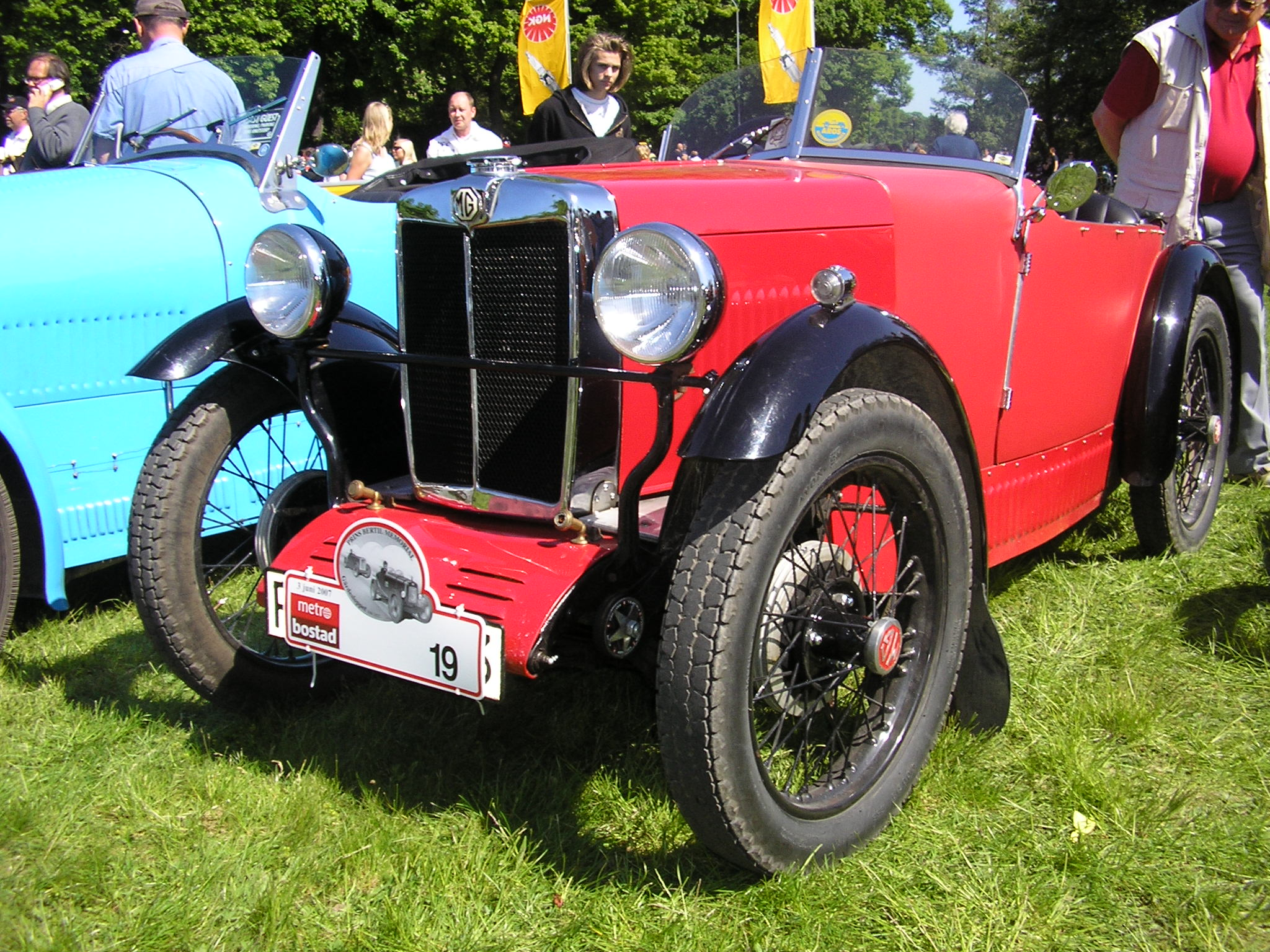
1930 MG M-type

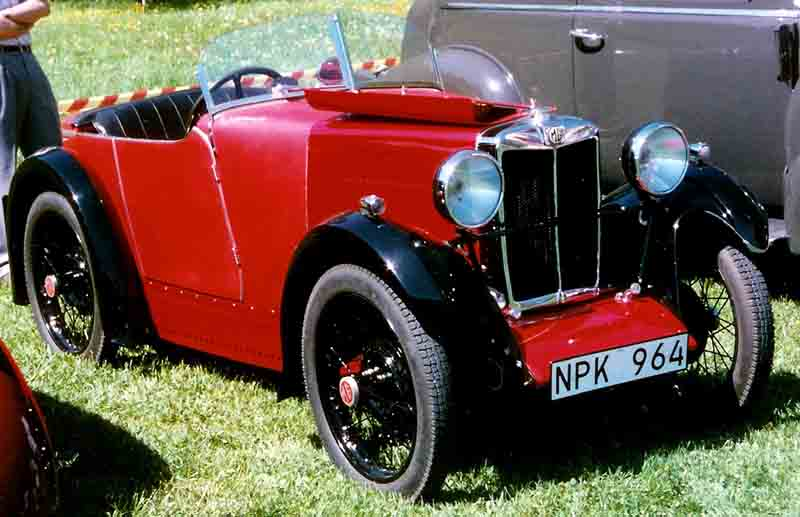
1931 MG M-type Midget 2-Seater Sports
