= Speed of the Wind =

Overview
- Manufacturer: C.T Delaney
- Production: one

Body and chassis
- Body style: Land speed record car

Powertrain
- Engine: Rolls-Royce Kestrel

Speed of the Wind was a record-breaking car of the 1930s, built between 1934 and 1935 and driven by Captain George Eyston.

The car was designed by Eyston and E A D Eldridge, then built by the father of Tom Delaney It was powered by an unsupercharged version of the V-12 Rolls-Royce Kestrel aero engine. The car was too large and heavy for circuit racing and was already underpowered by the standards of the absolute speed record breakers. This car was designed for endurance, more than peak power. Running a supercharged engine with the fuel and materials technology of the day would never have lasted the duration. This particular engine was obtained second-hand from Rolls-Royce, where it had previously powered an airflow fan in an engine test cell. Having always been intended for long-term use at ground level, it had been built without the Kestrel's usual supercharger.

For streamlining, distinctive features of the car are the two small "nostrils", headlights and air inlets in the nose. These produced less drag than a typical inlet and flat honeycomb radiator. The engine was cooled instead by a surface radiator wrapped around the top of the bodywork, just in front of the driver.

During testing, the car appears to have run, although not competitively, at either Brooklands or Montlhery.

== Records ==
Speed of the Wind was built for long-duration speed records, which were the domain of Ab Jenkins and the Bonneville salt flats of Utah. Jenkins was fond of competition and was instrumental in encouraging British teams to travel to Bonneville.

=== 1935 ===
After setting the 24 hour record

In September 1935, shortly after Campbell's 300 mph record with Blue Bird, Eyston broke Jenkins' 24-hour record and raised it to 140.52 mph (226.15 km/h)

=== 1936 ===
For the 1936 season, Jenkins created the Mormon Meteor by fitting a Curtiss Conqueror V12 into his previous Duesenberg chassis. Eyston returned, with E A D Eldridge as team manager, and his colleague from Brooklands, John Cobb in the Napier-Railton as another competitor.

Eyston set the first records, averaging 149.096 mph (239.947 km/h) for 24 hours and 136.34 mph (219.42 km/h) over 48 hours.

The Mormon Meteor made its first attempt, beating the average speed to 12 hours at 152.84 mph (245.97 km/h), but retiring with a driveshaft failure. John Cobb then took Eyston’s 24 hour record at 150.163 mph (241.664 km/h), but didn't attempt 48.

The Meteor made a second attempt, and this time remained reliable. Its two co-drivers set times of 153.823 mph (247.554 km/h) for 24 hours and 148.641 mph (239.215 km/h) for 48.

== Demise ==
The remains of the car were destroyed by Luftwaffe bombing during World War II.

== Models ==
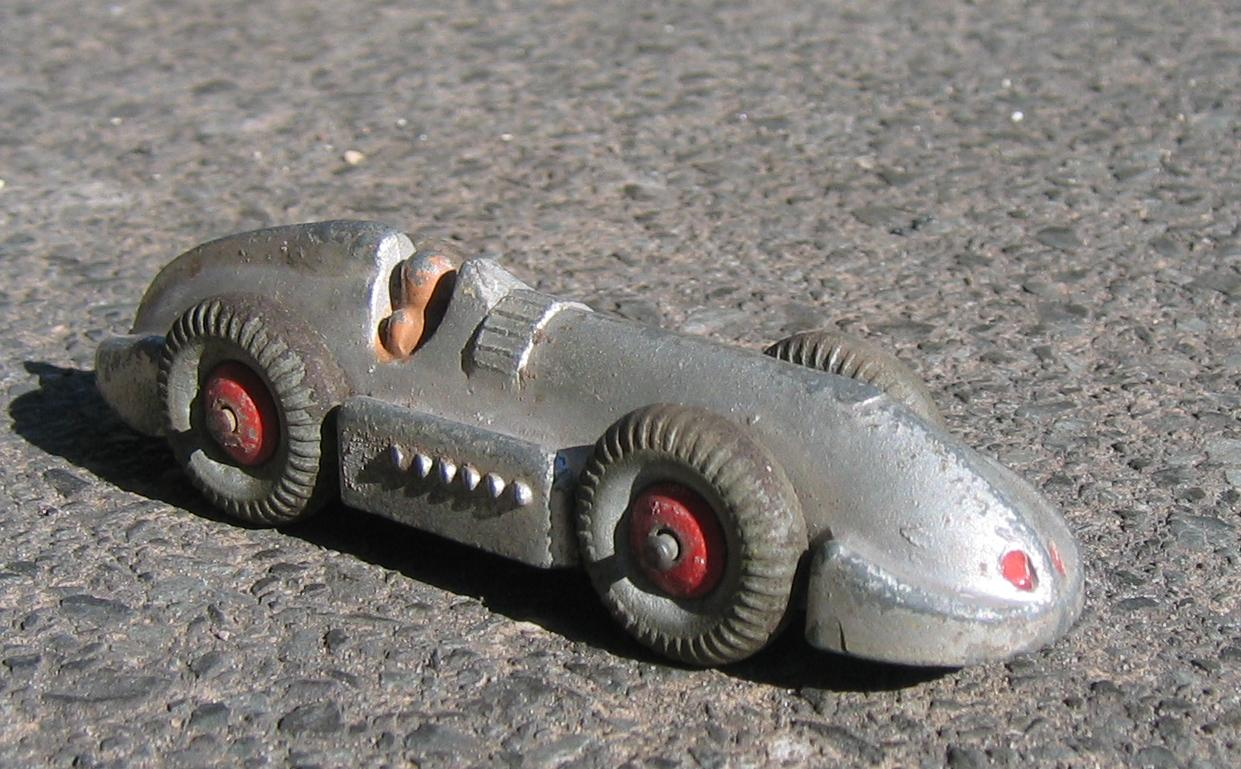
post-war Dinky model

Meccano produced a model of the car as part of its Dinky Toys range, both pre and post-war. Tommy Doo Toys and Johillco also produced models of this car.
