= Fiat Mephistopheles =

Coordinates: 45°02′44″N 7°40′47″E

Mephistopheles
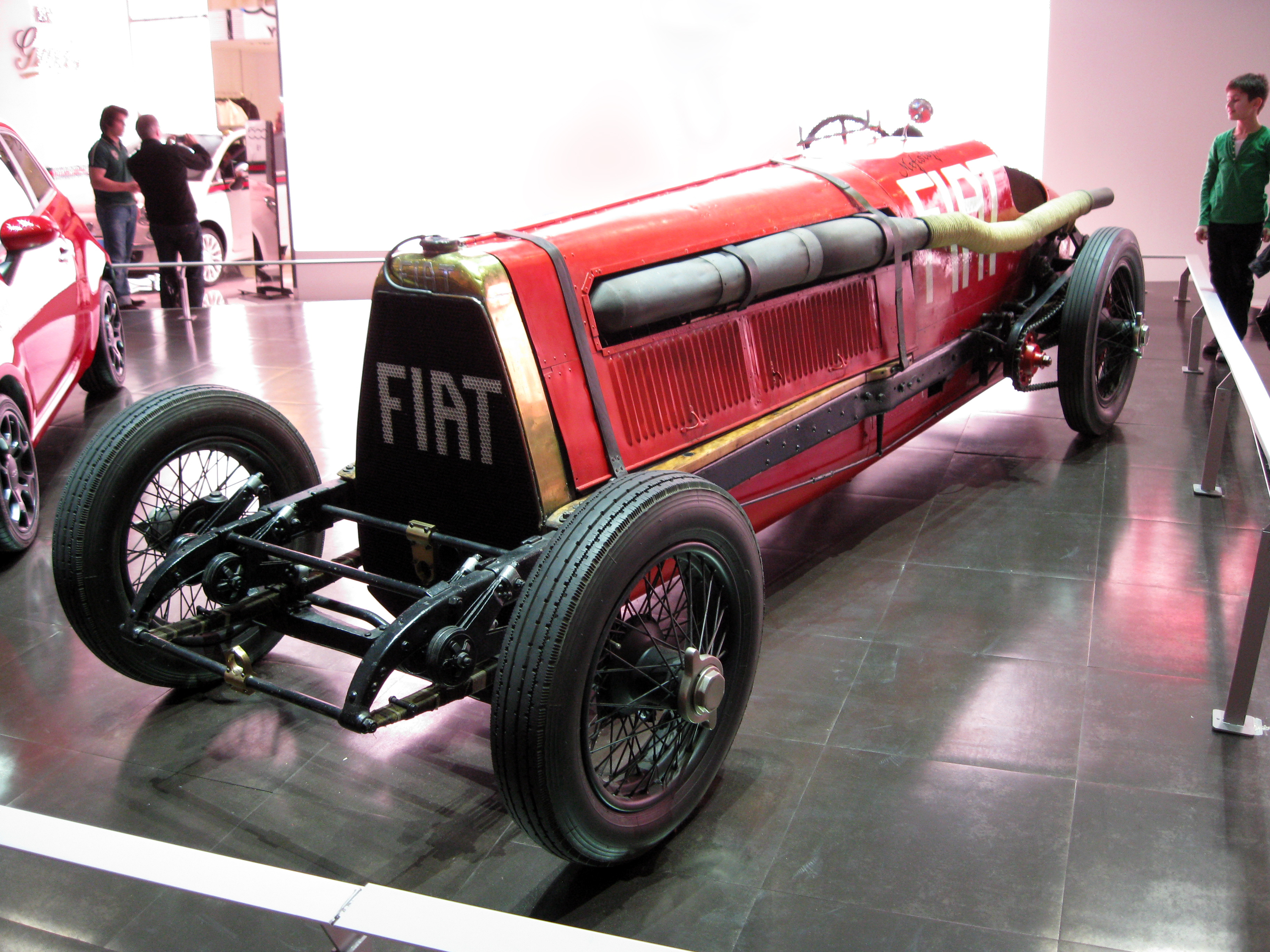

Overview
- Manufacturer: Fiat
- Production: 1923
- Assembly: Arpajon, France
- Designer: Ernest Eldridge

Body and chassis
- Class: Land speed record
- Body style: Open-Wheeler
- Layout: Front Engine, RWD
- Related: Fiat SB4

Powertrain
- Engine: 21,706 cc (1,324.6 cu in) Fiat A.12 Inline 6
- Power output: 320 PS (315.6 hp; 235.4 kW) @ 1,800 rpm 2,390 N⋅m (1,762.8 lbf⋅ft)
- Transmission: 4-speed Manual

Dimensions
- Wheelbase: 3,683 mm (145.0 in)
- Length: 5,112 mm (201.3 in)
- Width: 1,766 mm (69.5 in)
- Height: 1,666 mm (65.6 in)
- Kerb weight: 3,175 kg (6,999.7 lb)

Chronology
- Predecessor: Fiat SB4
- Successor: Fiat S61

The Fiat Mephistopheles (known in Italian as Mefistofele) is a one-off racing car created by Ernest A.D. Eldridge in 1923 by combining a Fiat racing car chassis and Fiat aeroplane engine. The name is from the demon of the same name. The name alluded to the infernal noise emitted from the unmuffled engine, and it was "baptised" by the Frenchmen.

Eldridge broke the World Land Speed Record on 12 July 1924 with the Mephistopheles, by driving at 234.98 km/h (146.0 mph) in Arpajon, France. The last car to set a land speed record on a public road.

The Mephistopheles was created by combining the chassis of the 1908 Fiat SB4 with a 6-cylinder, 21.7 L (21,706 cc) Fiat A.12 aeroplane engine producing 320 PS (235 kW; 316 bhp).

Mephistopheles was restored over 5 years, with another example of the same engine, and returned in 2011 with a display at the Goodwood Festival of Speed.

Fiat Mephistopheles Gallery

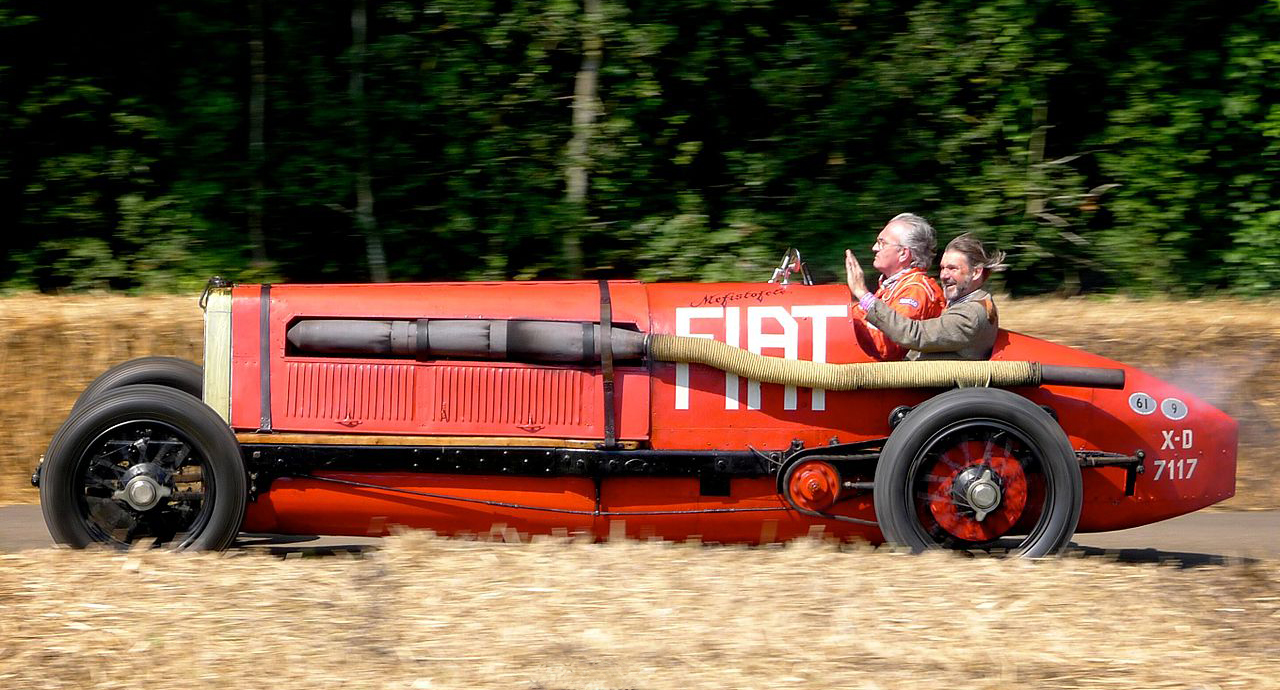

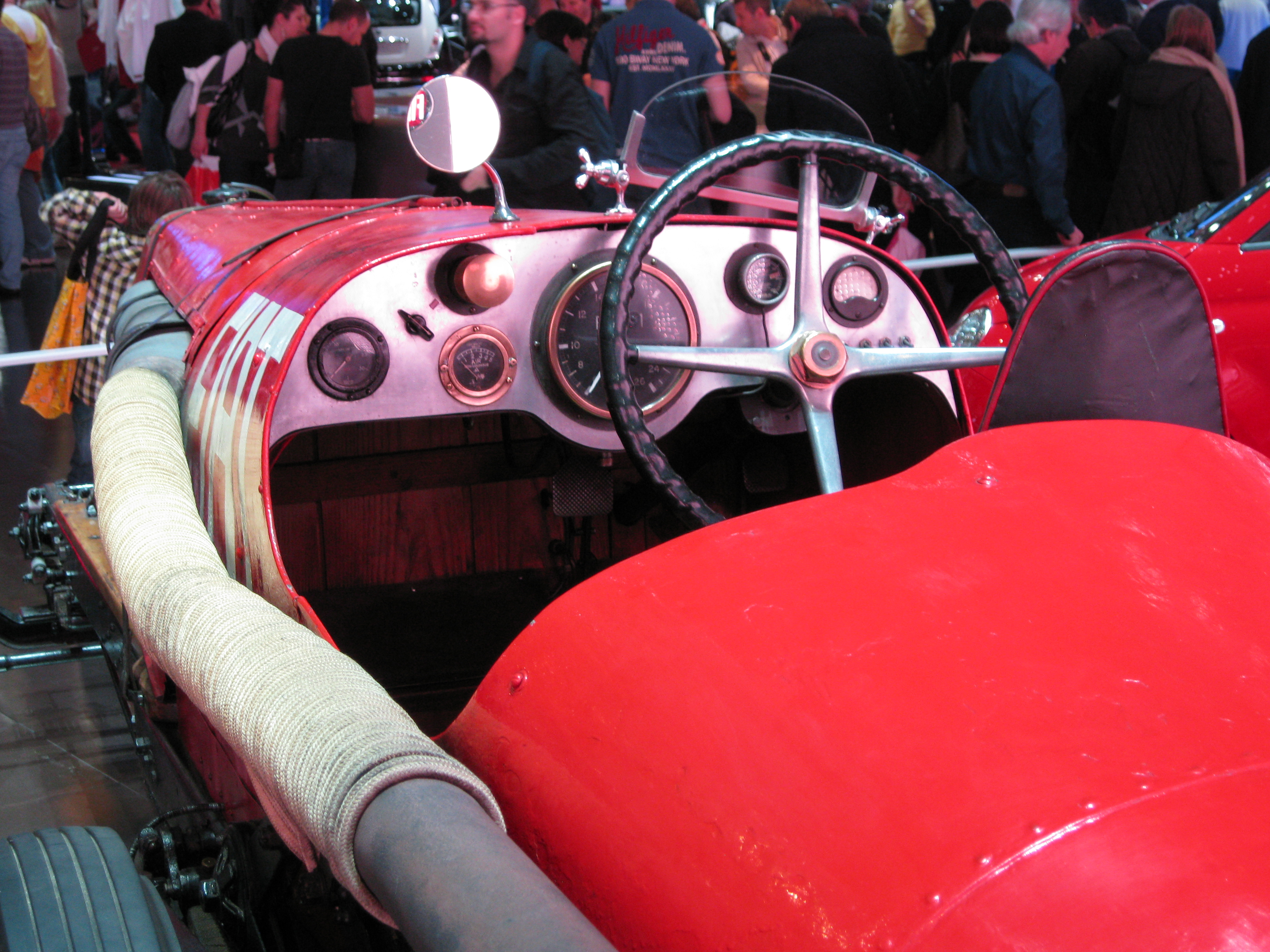

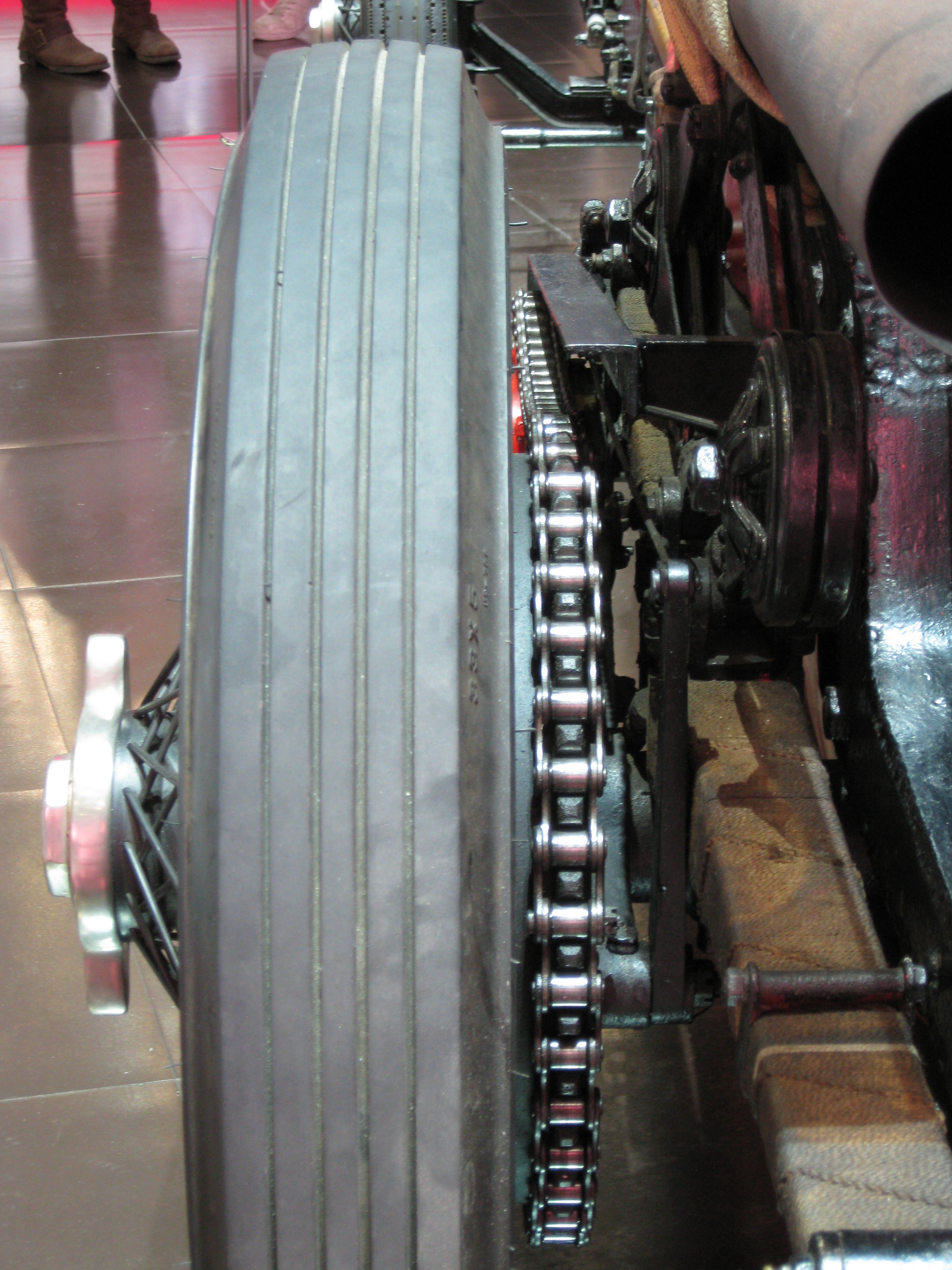

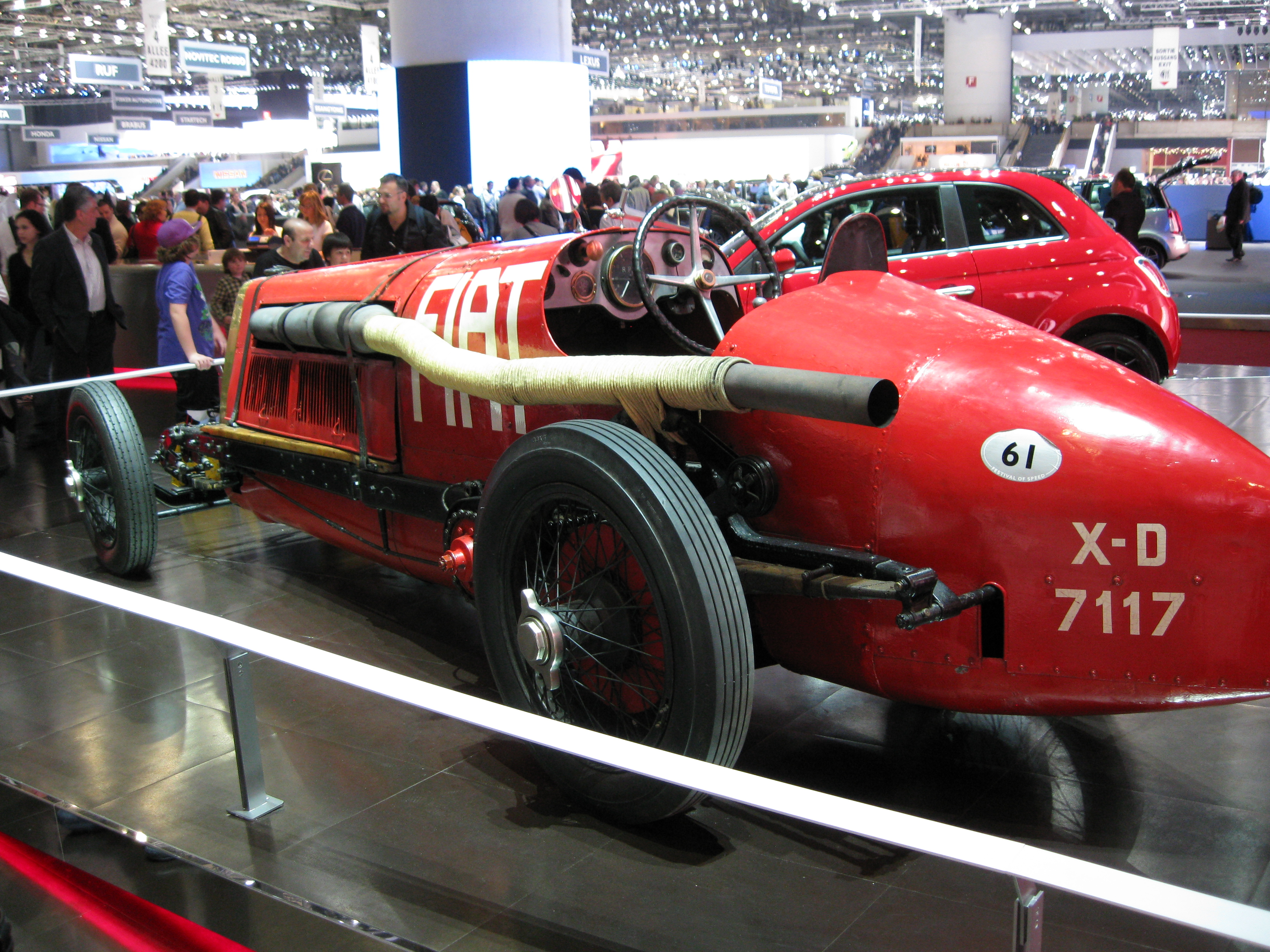

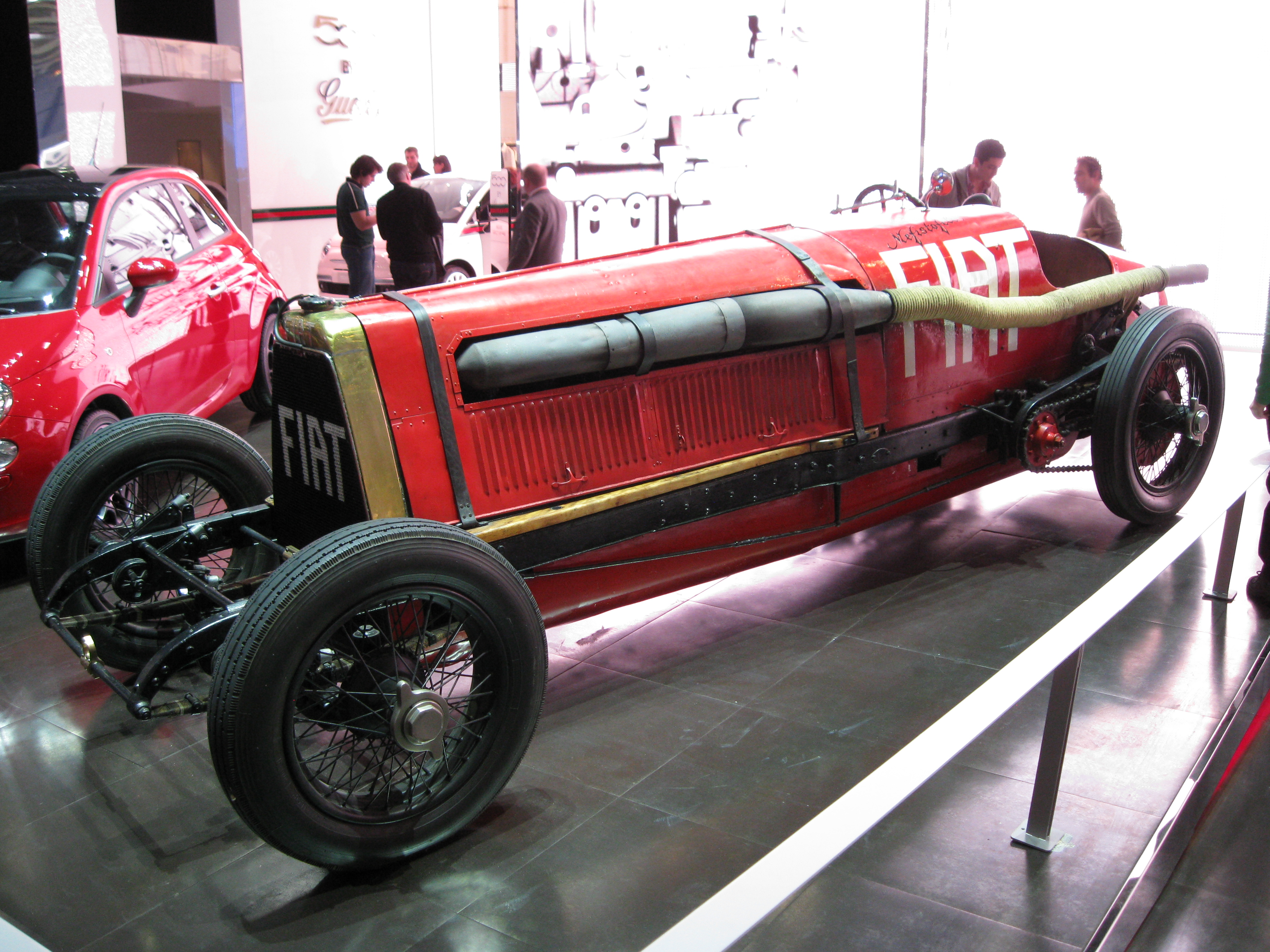

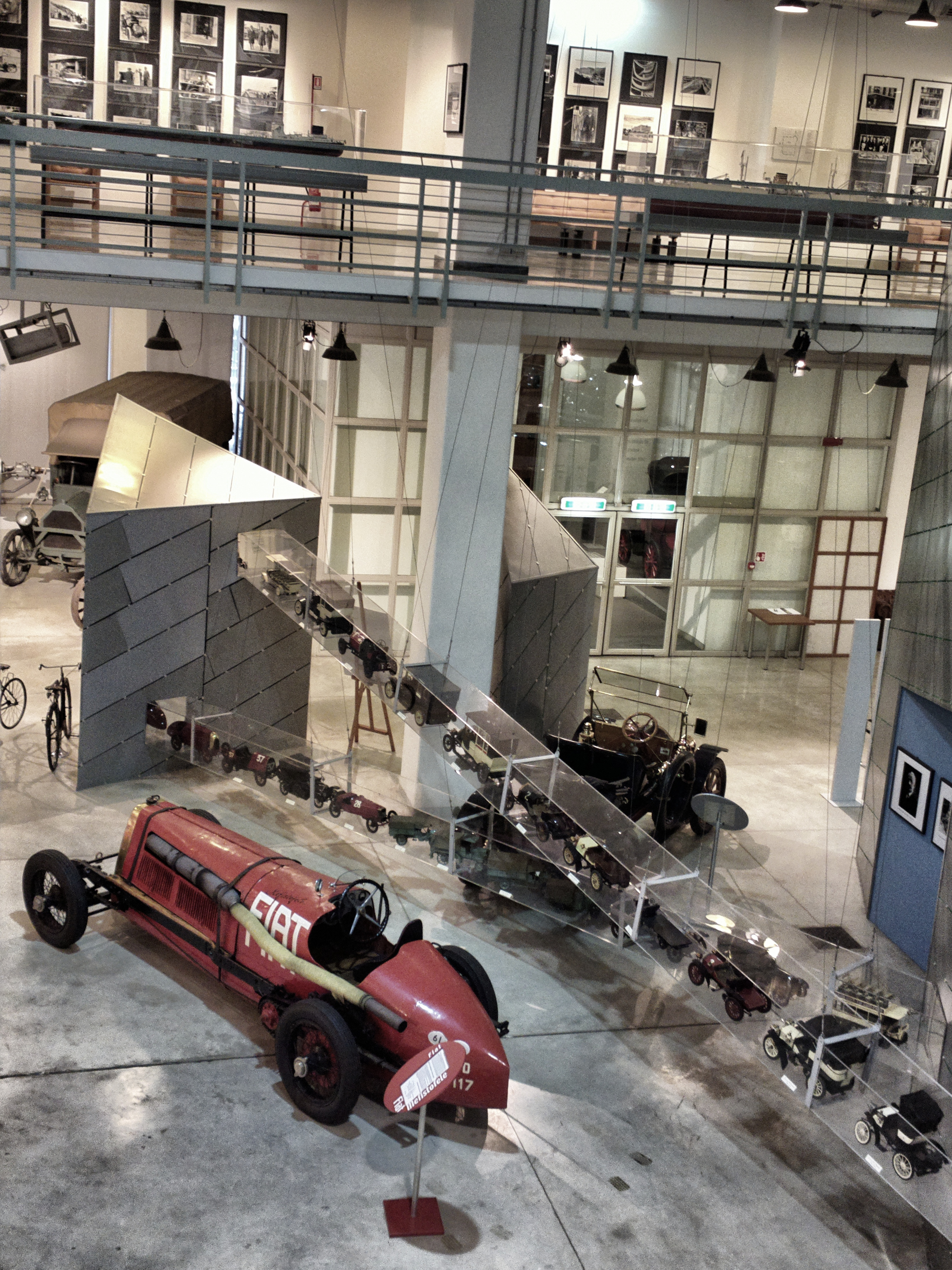

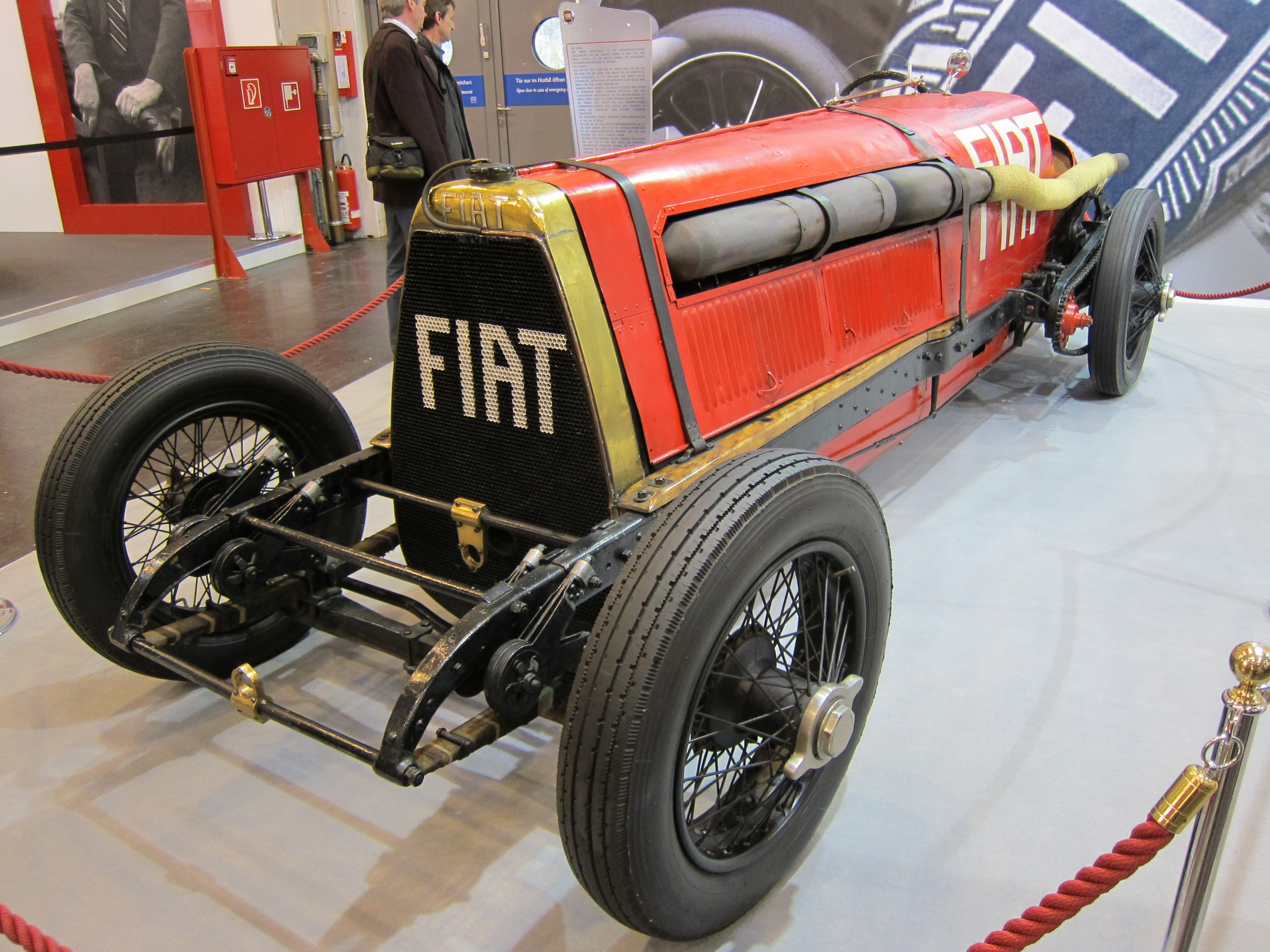

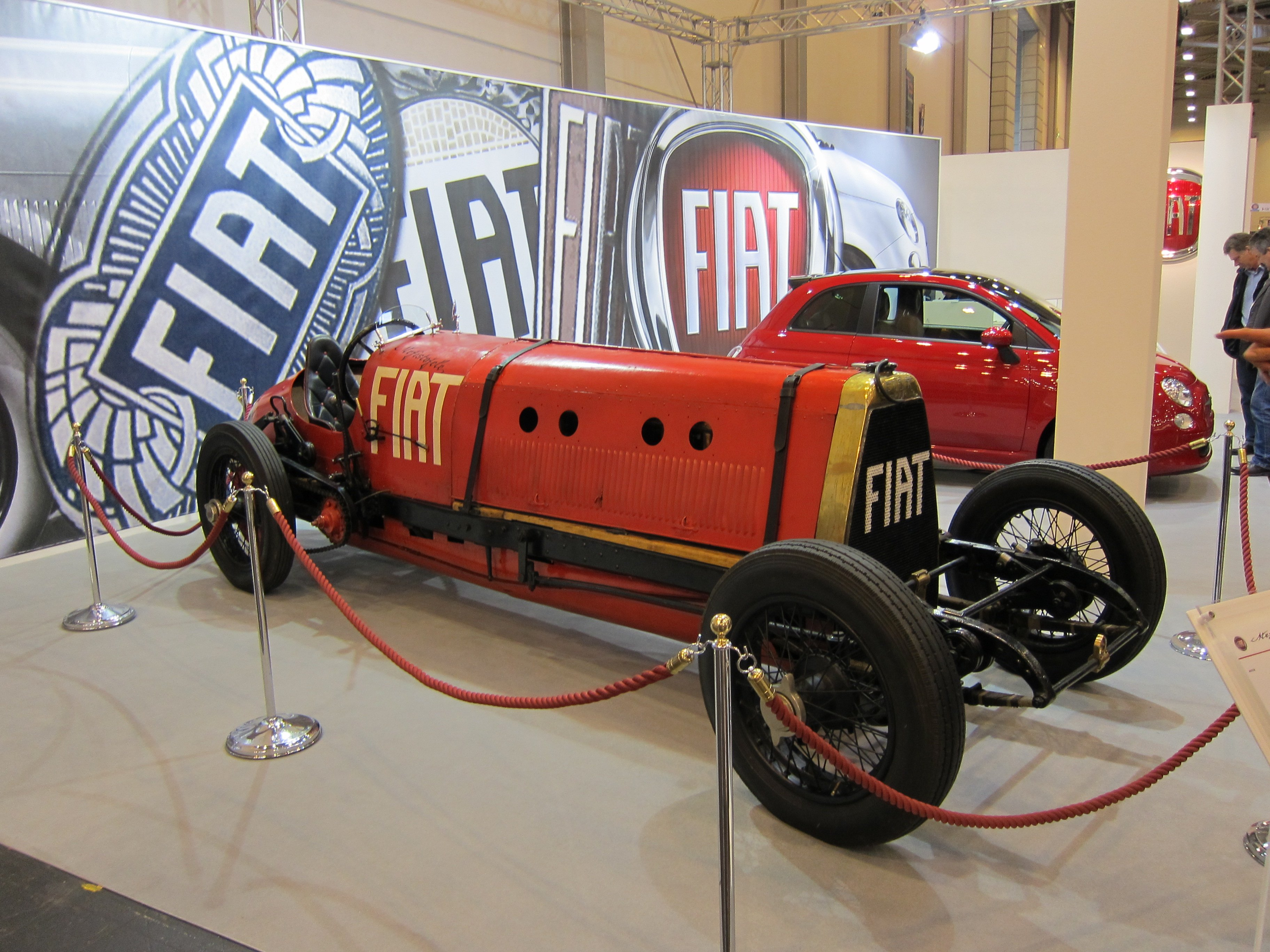

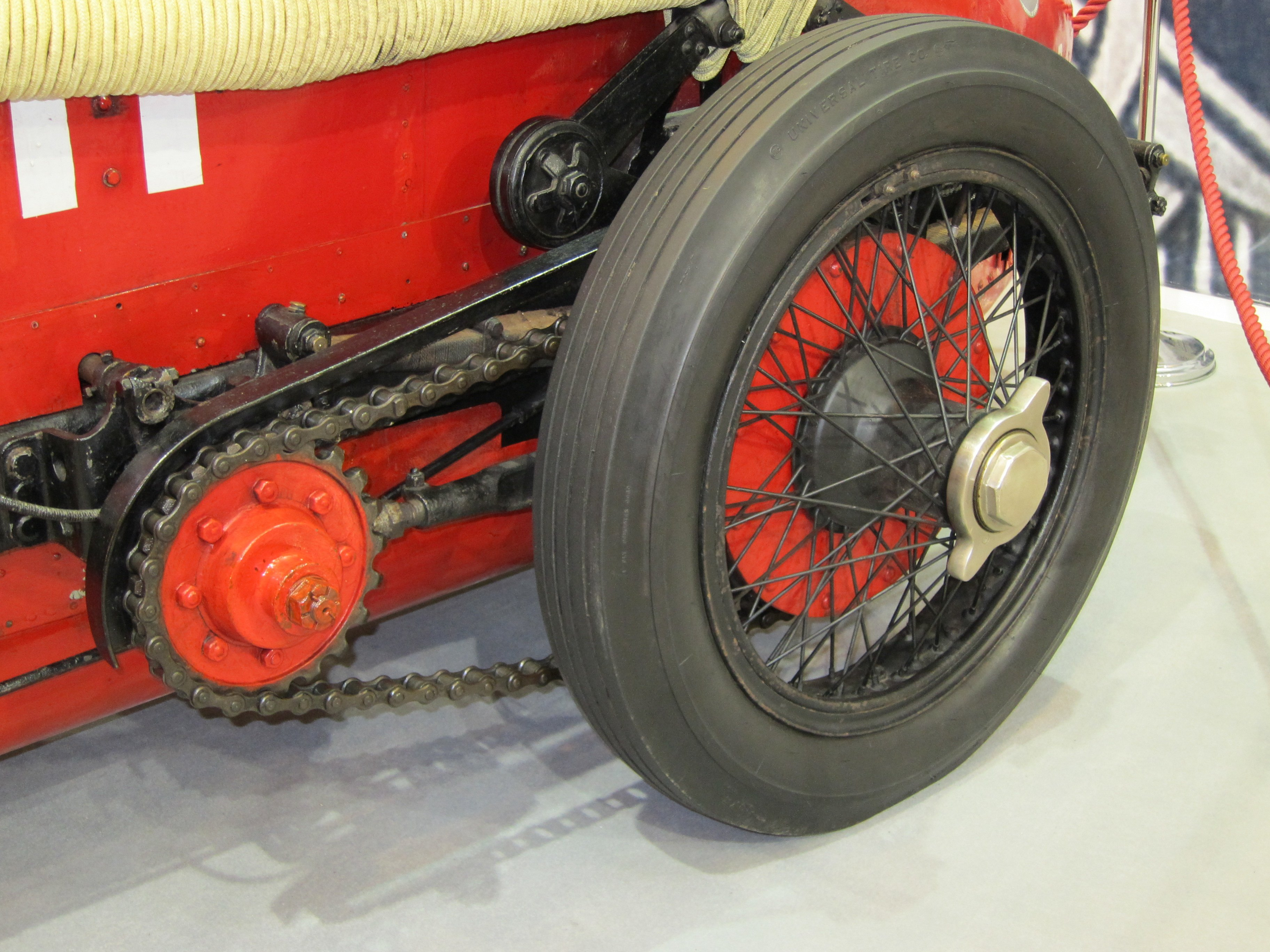

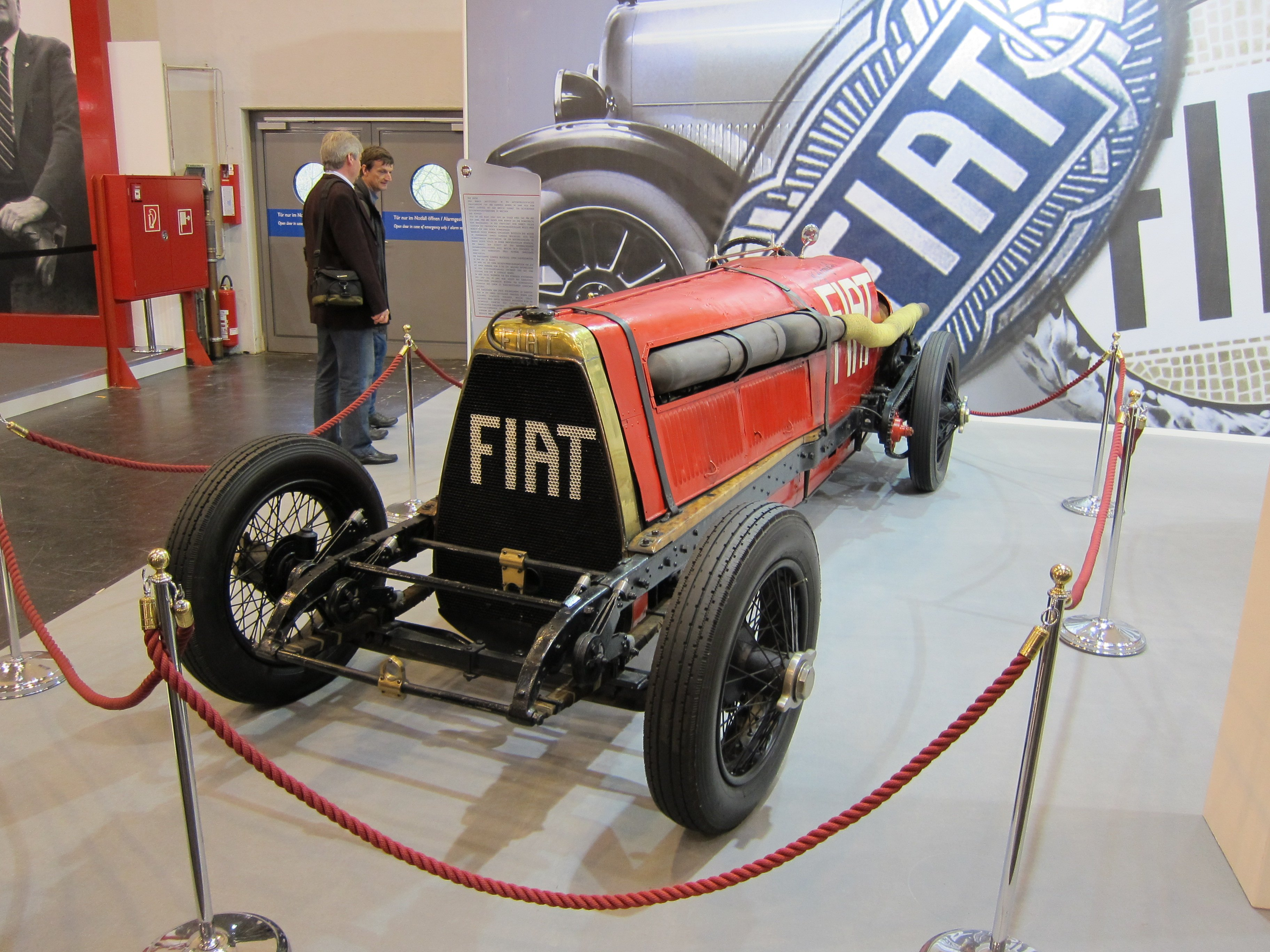

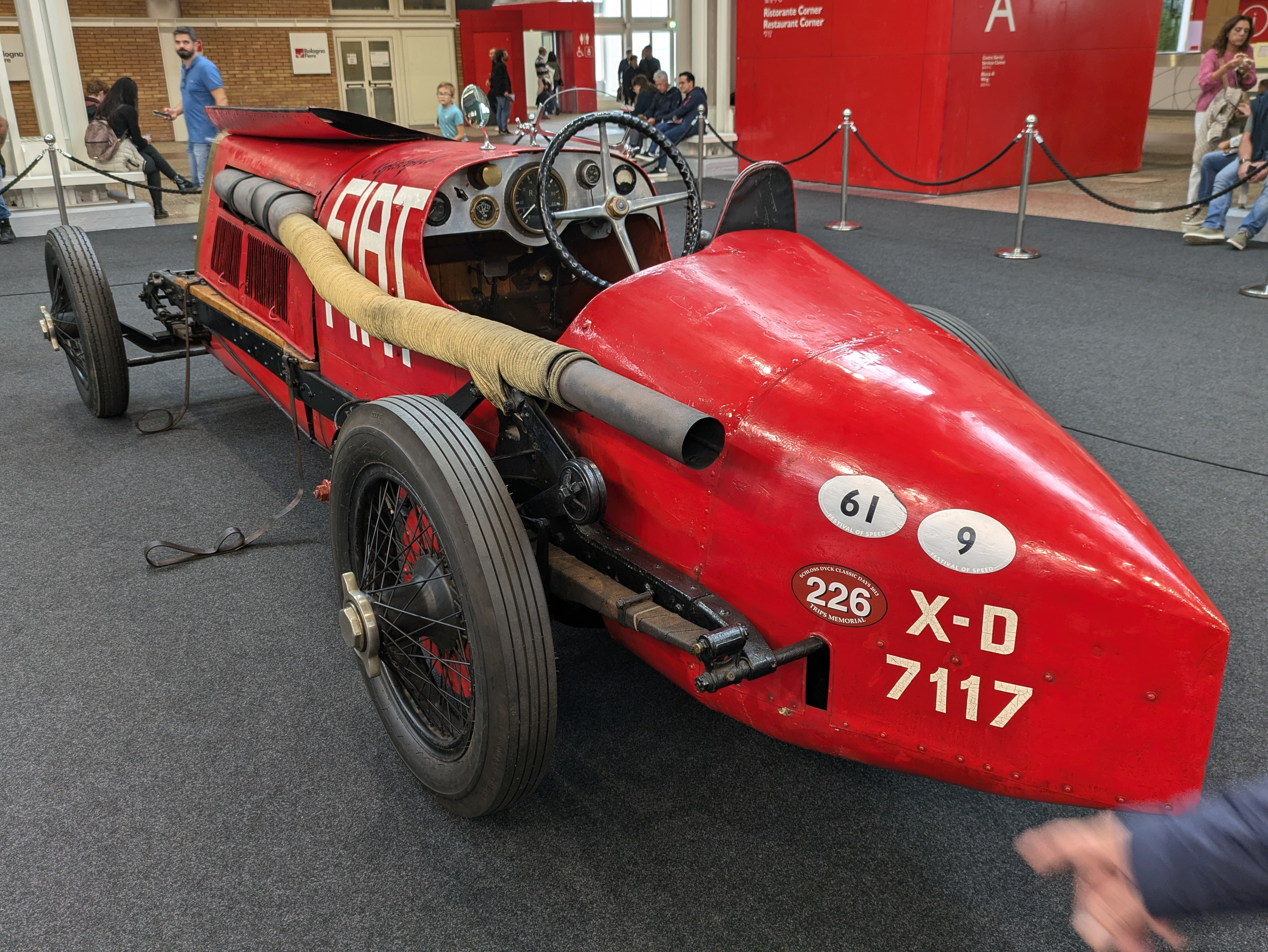

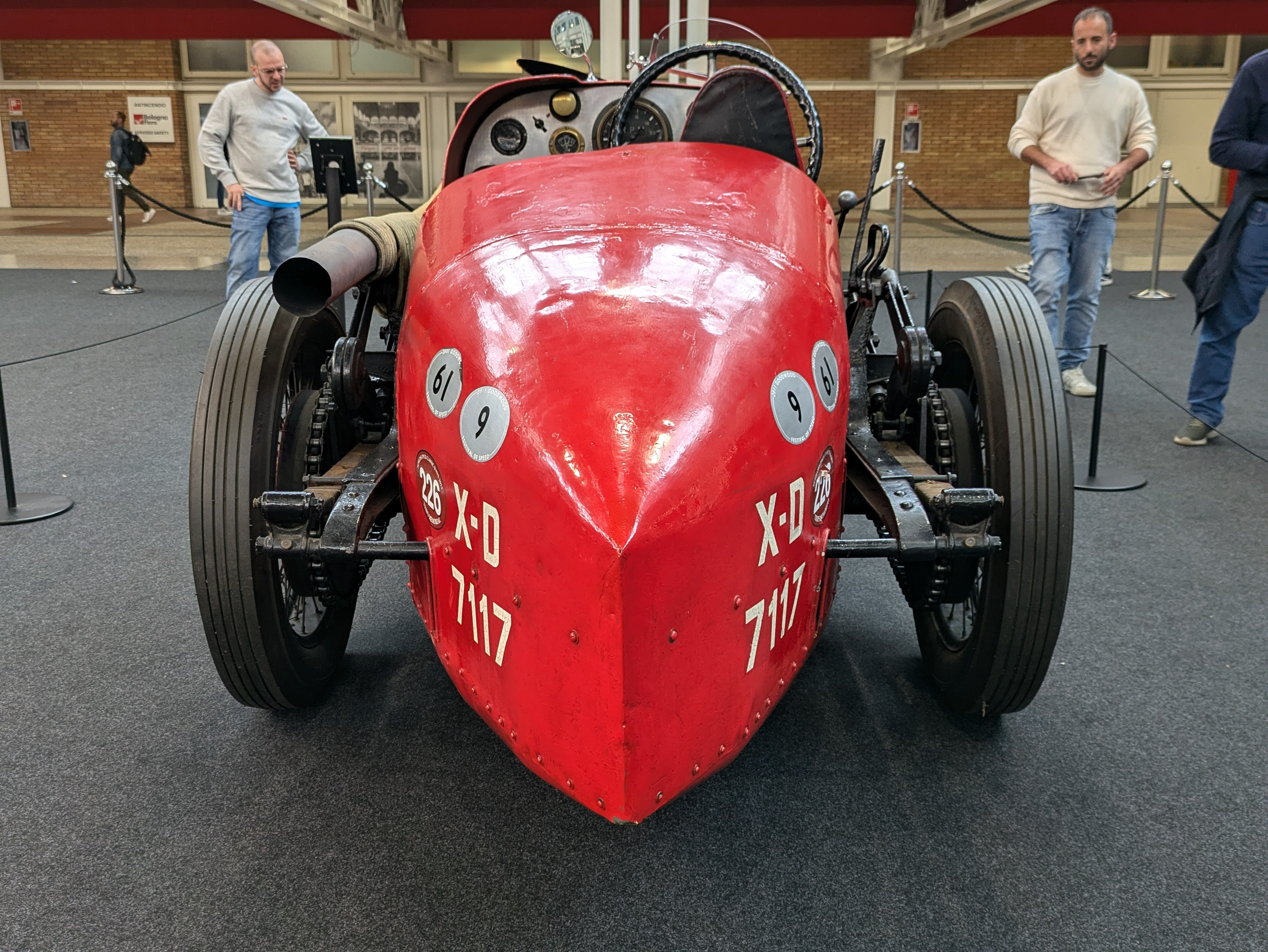

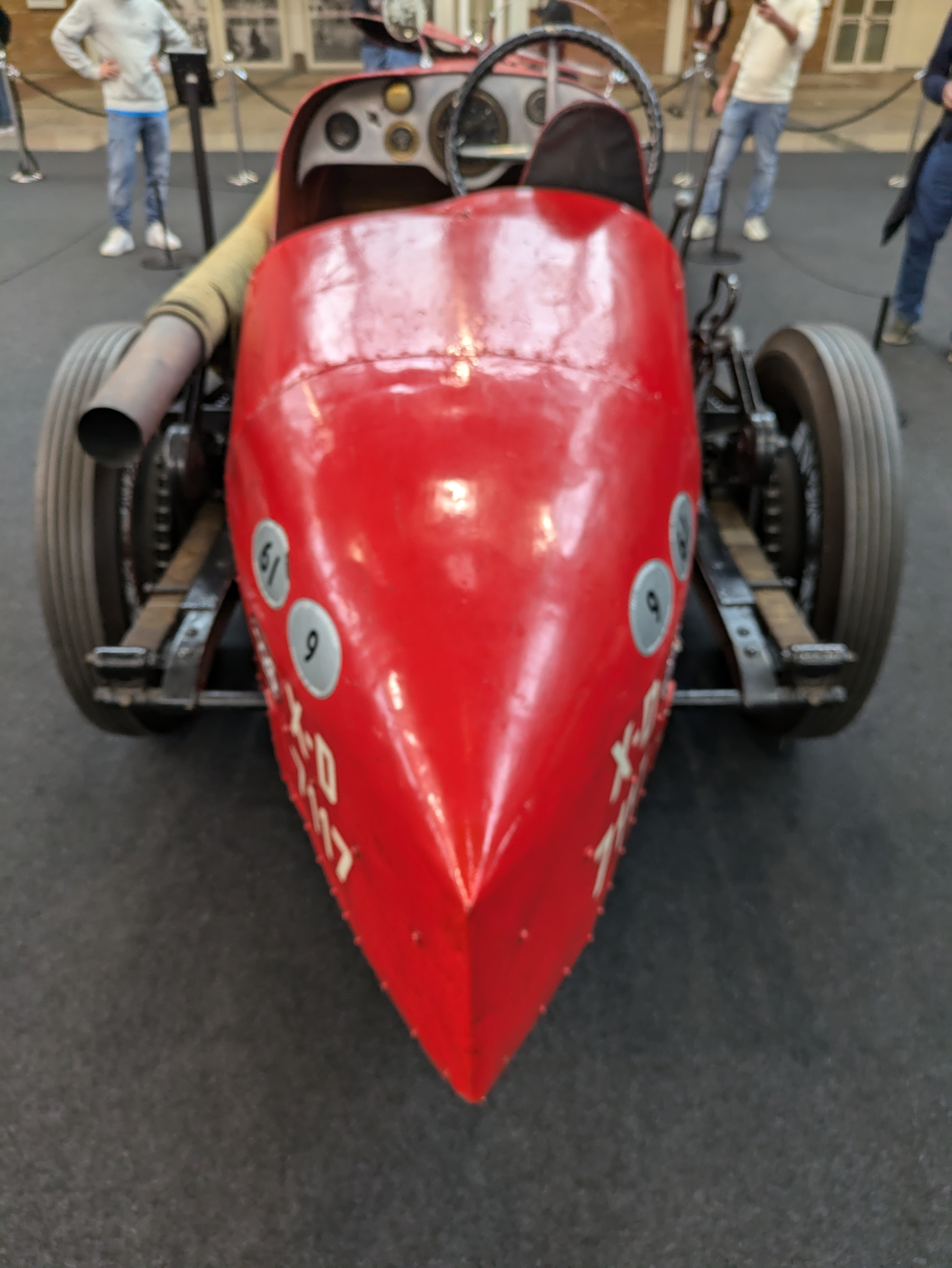

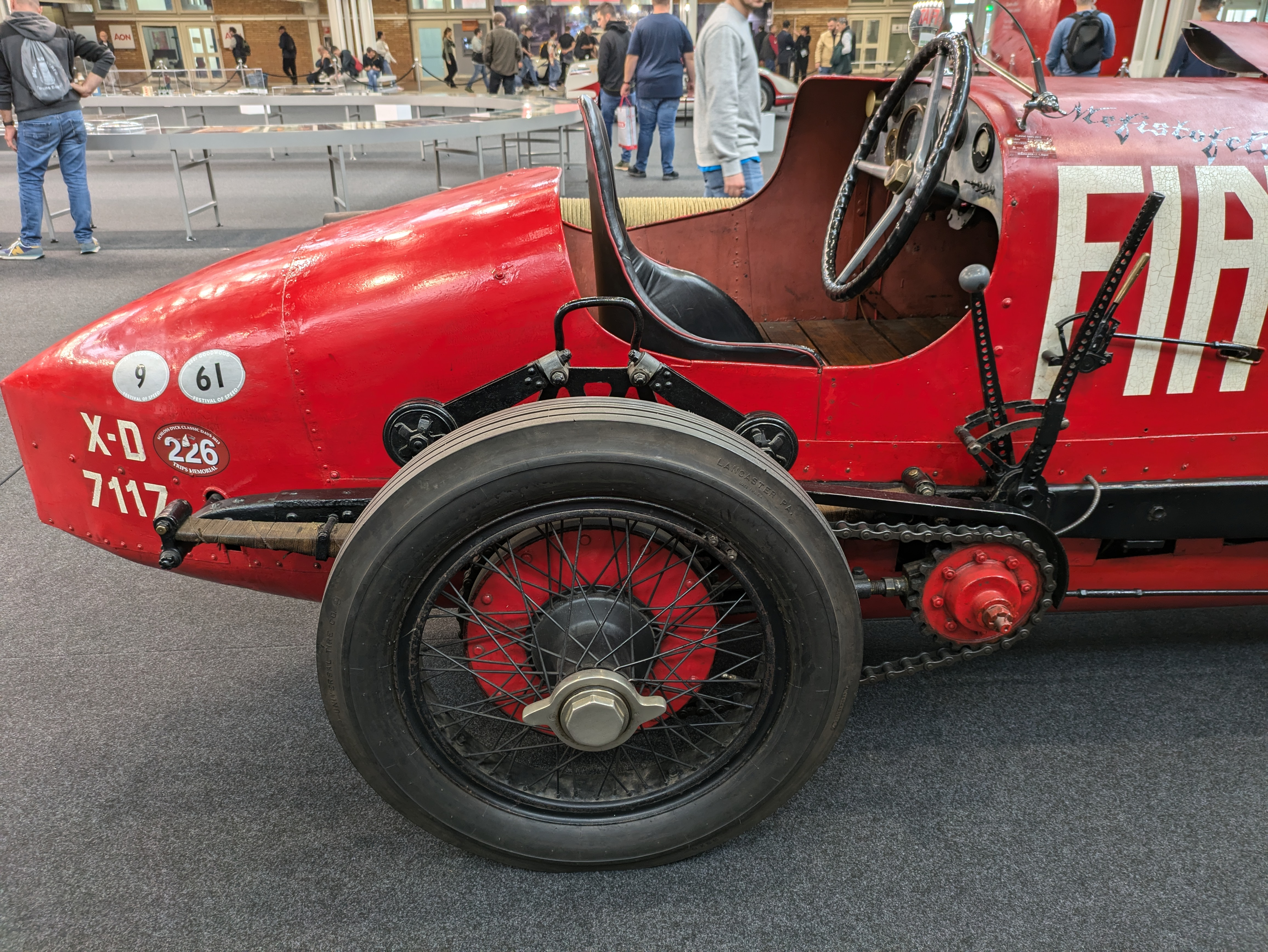

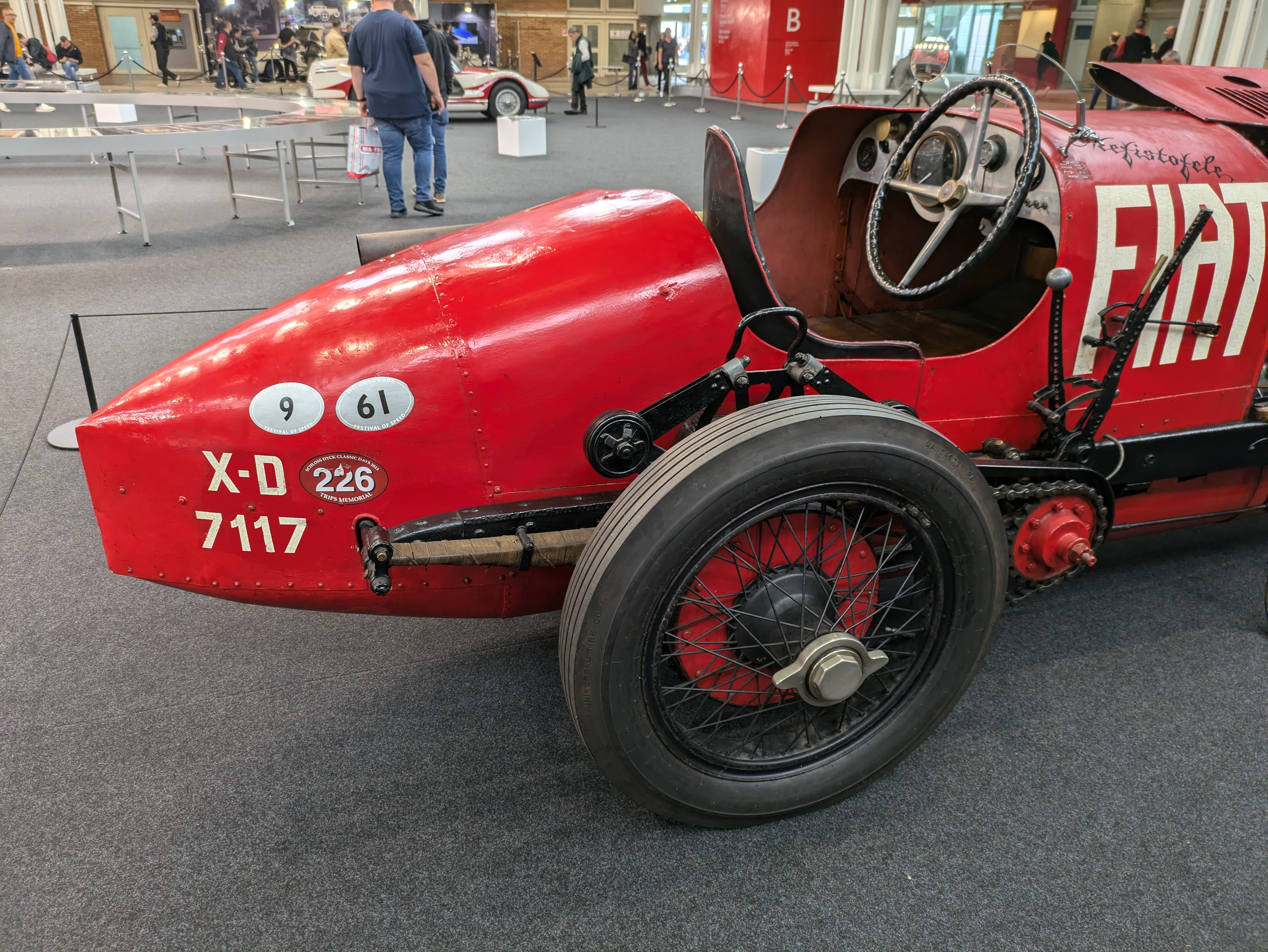

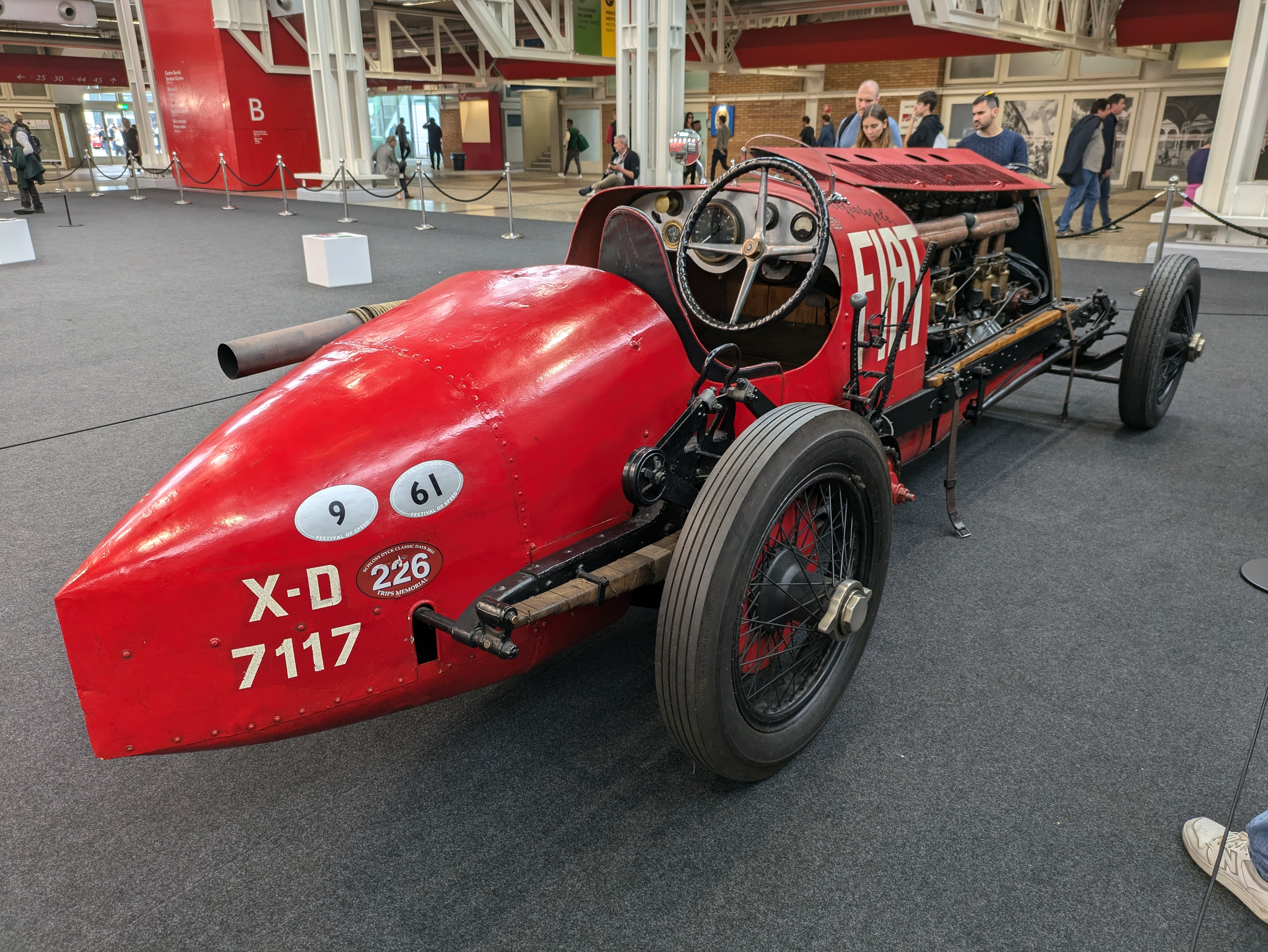

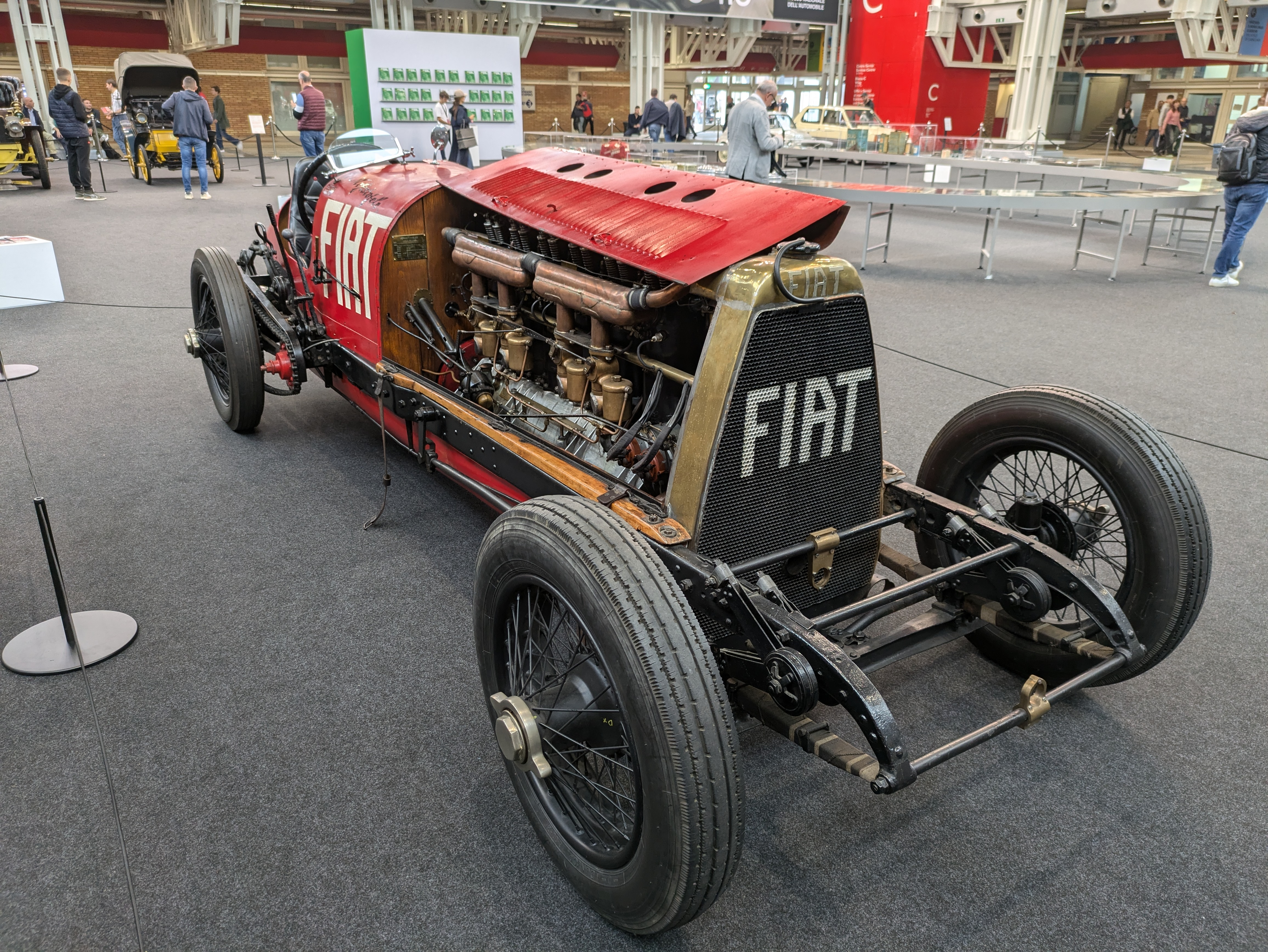

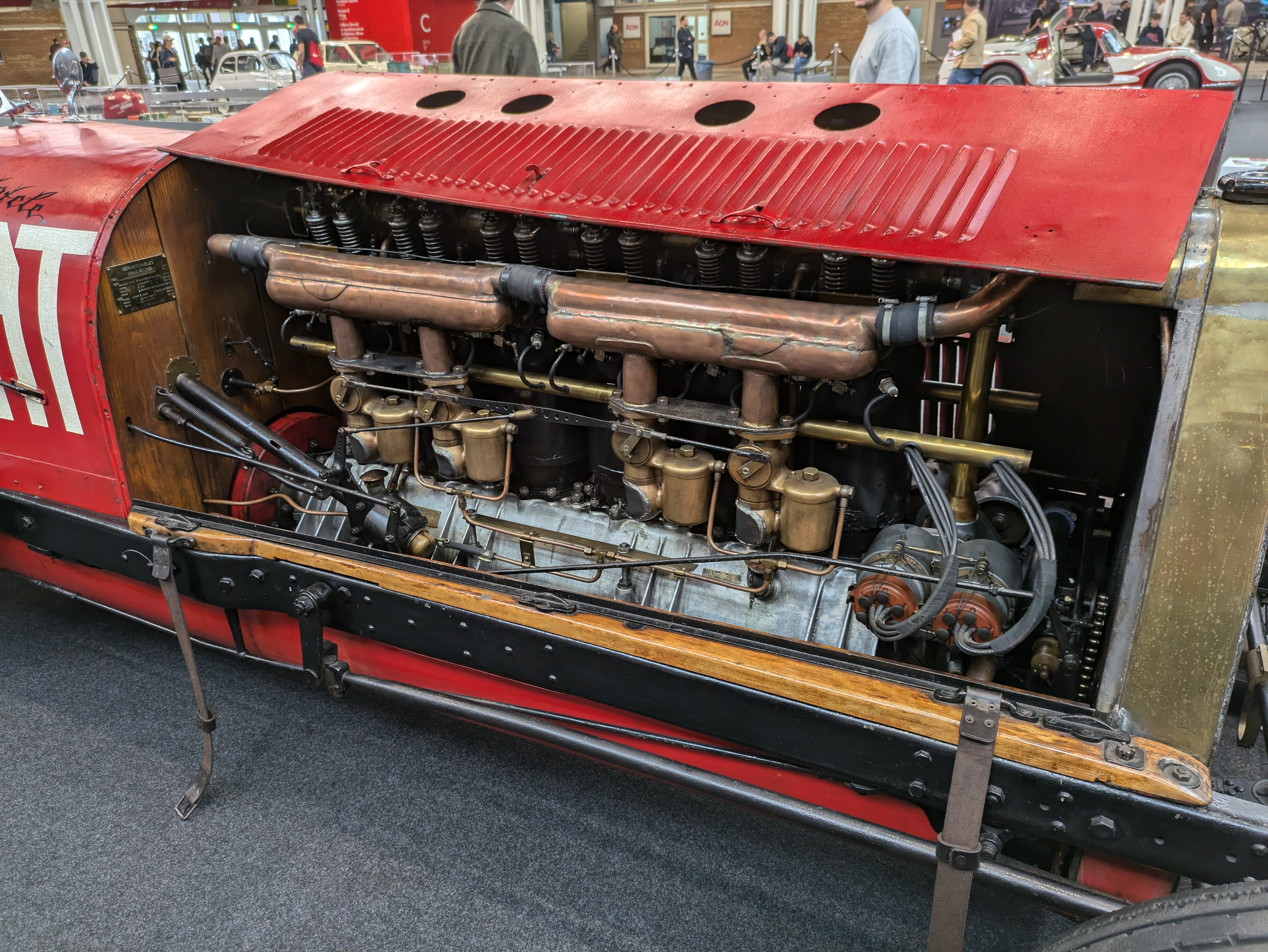

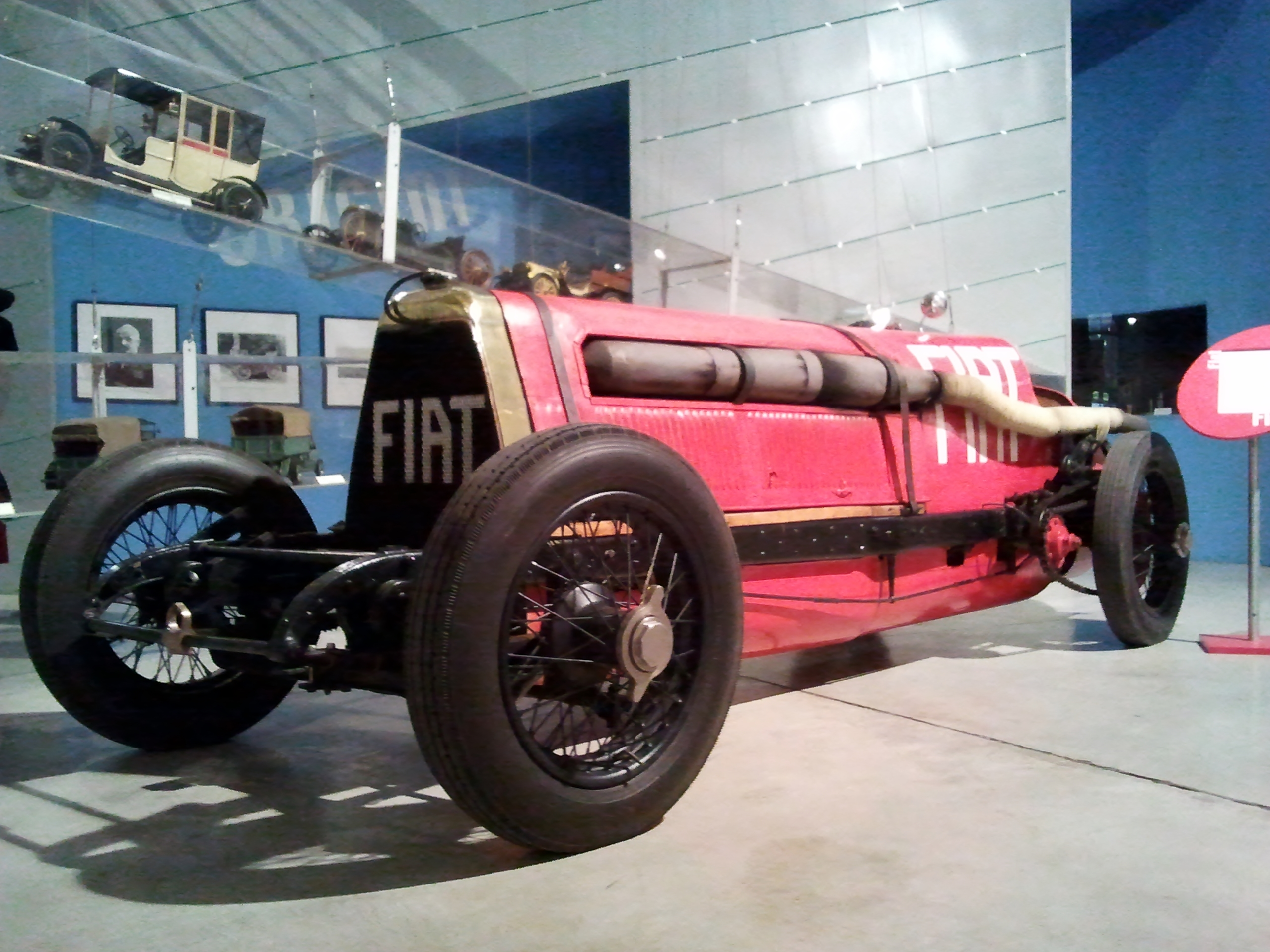

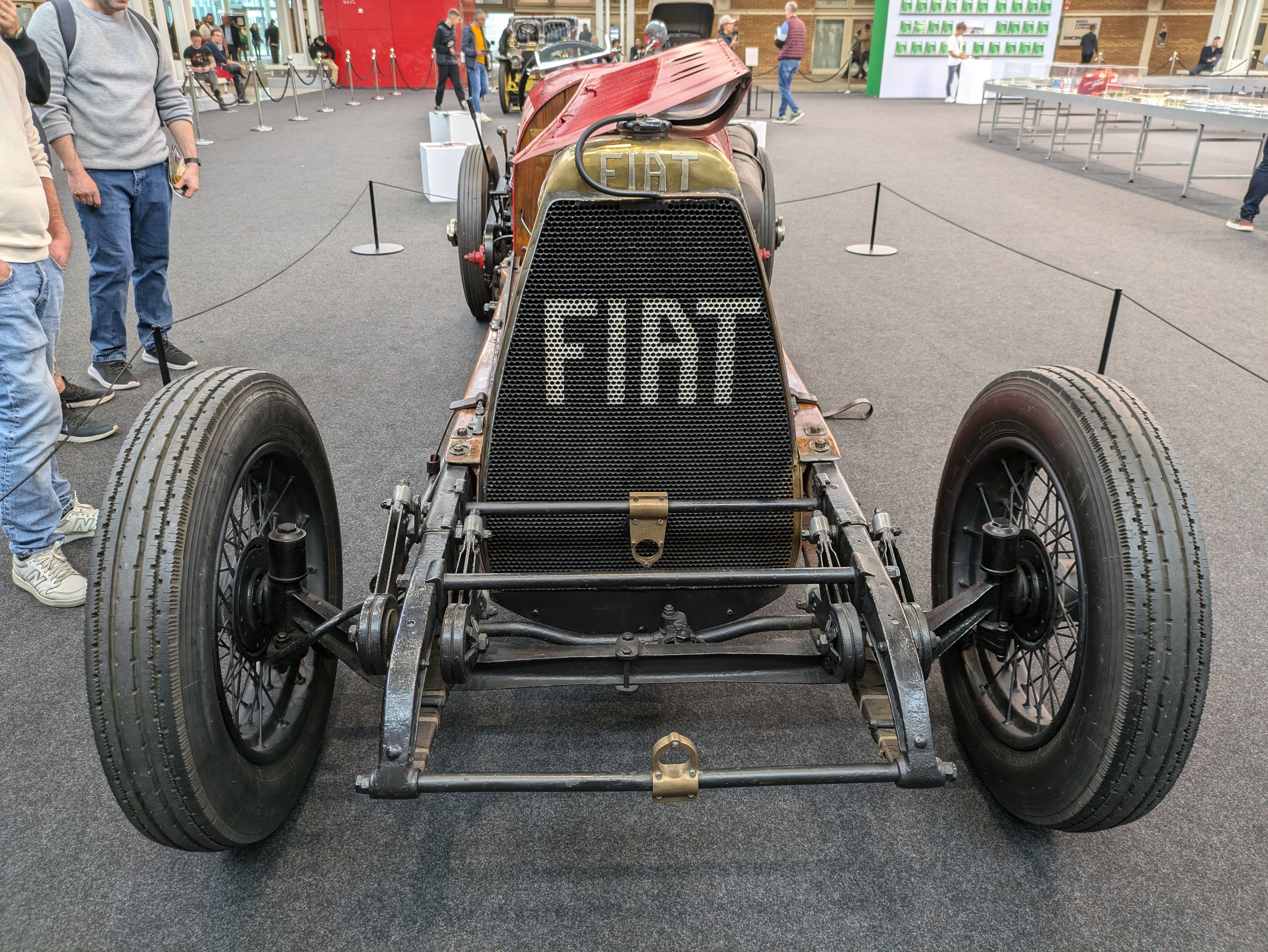

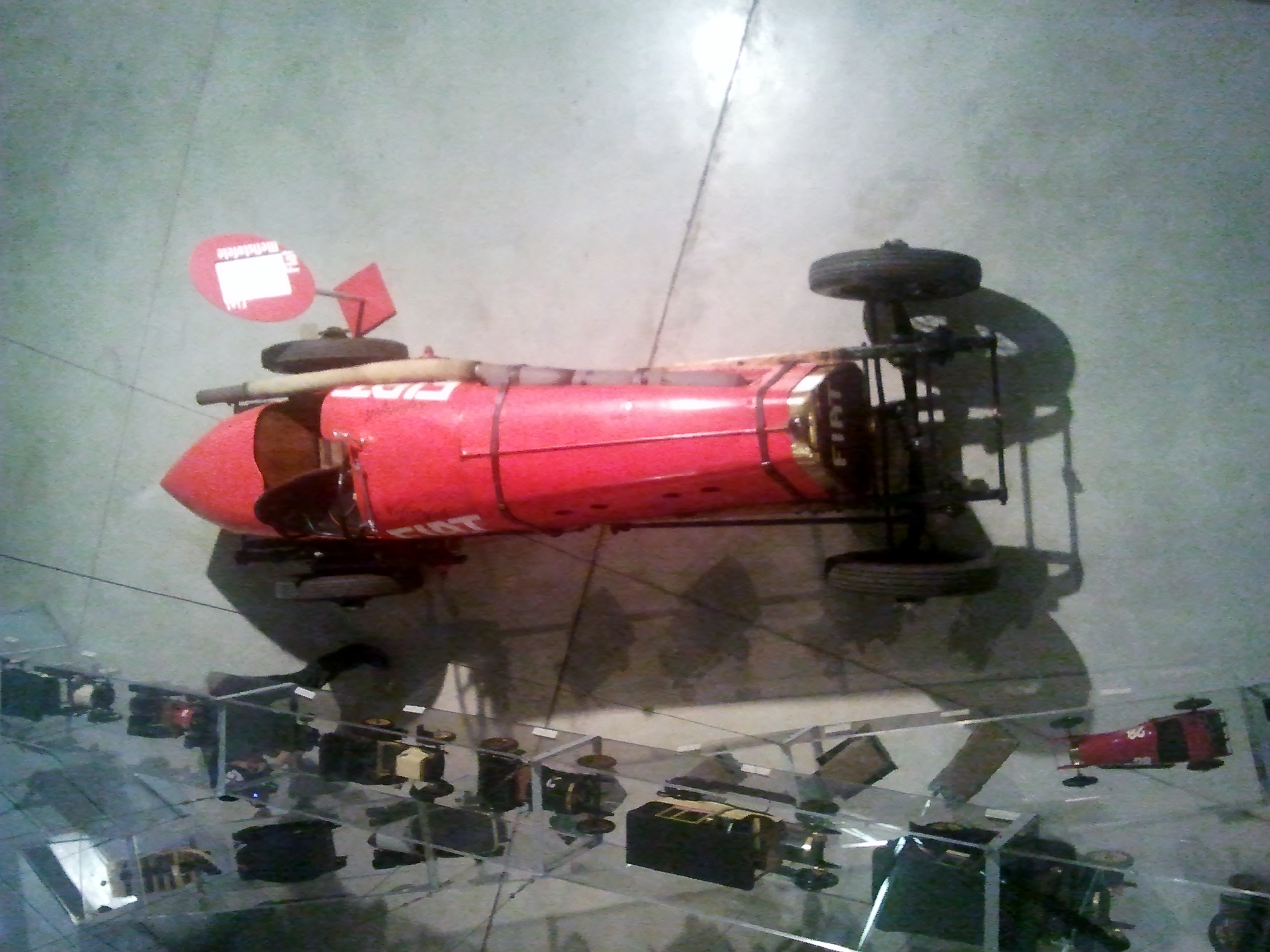

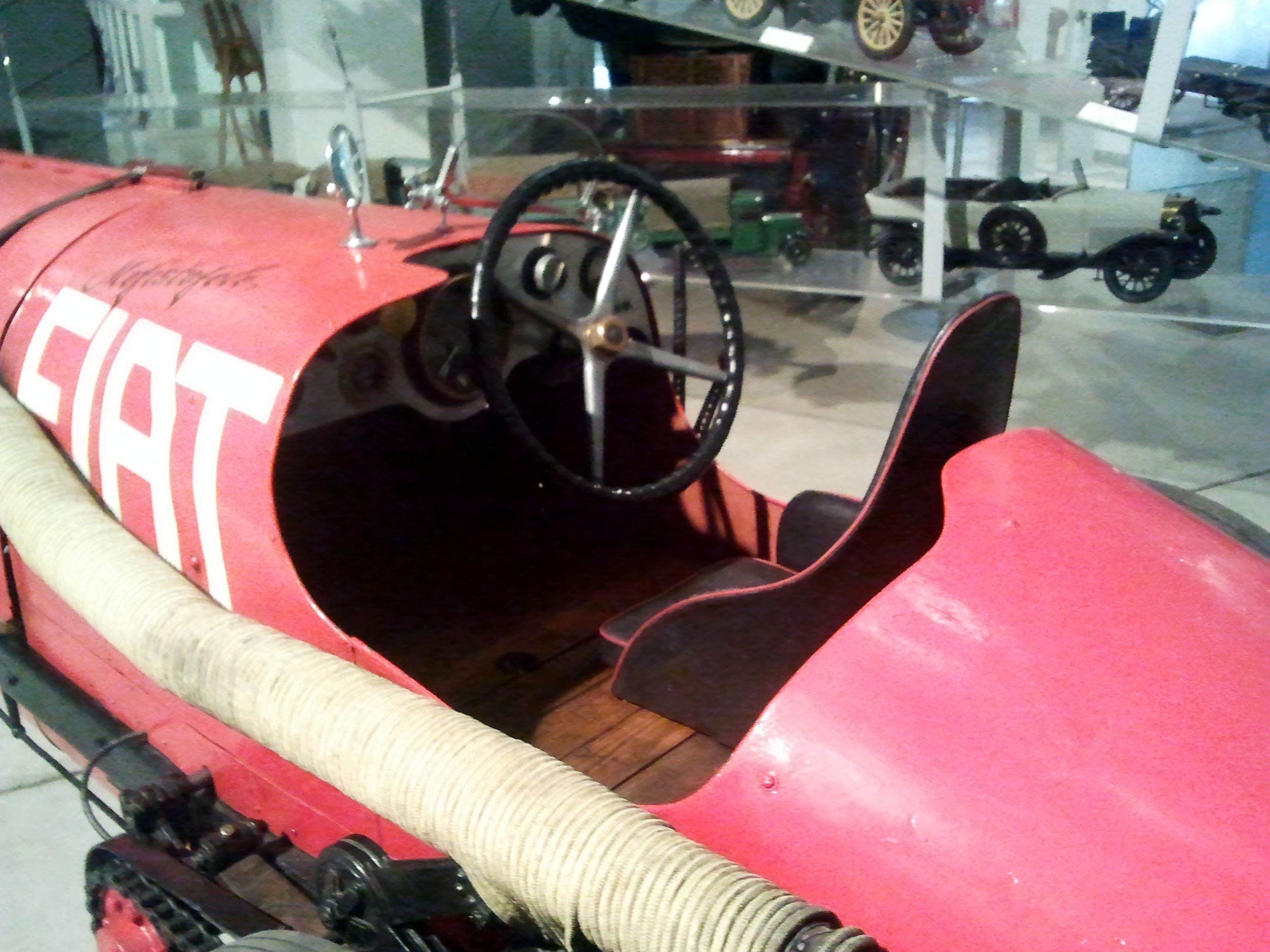

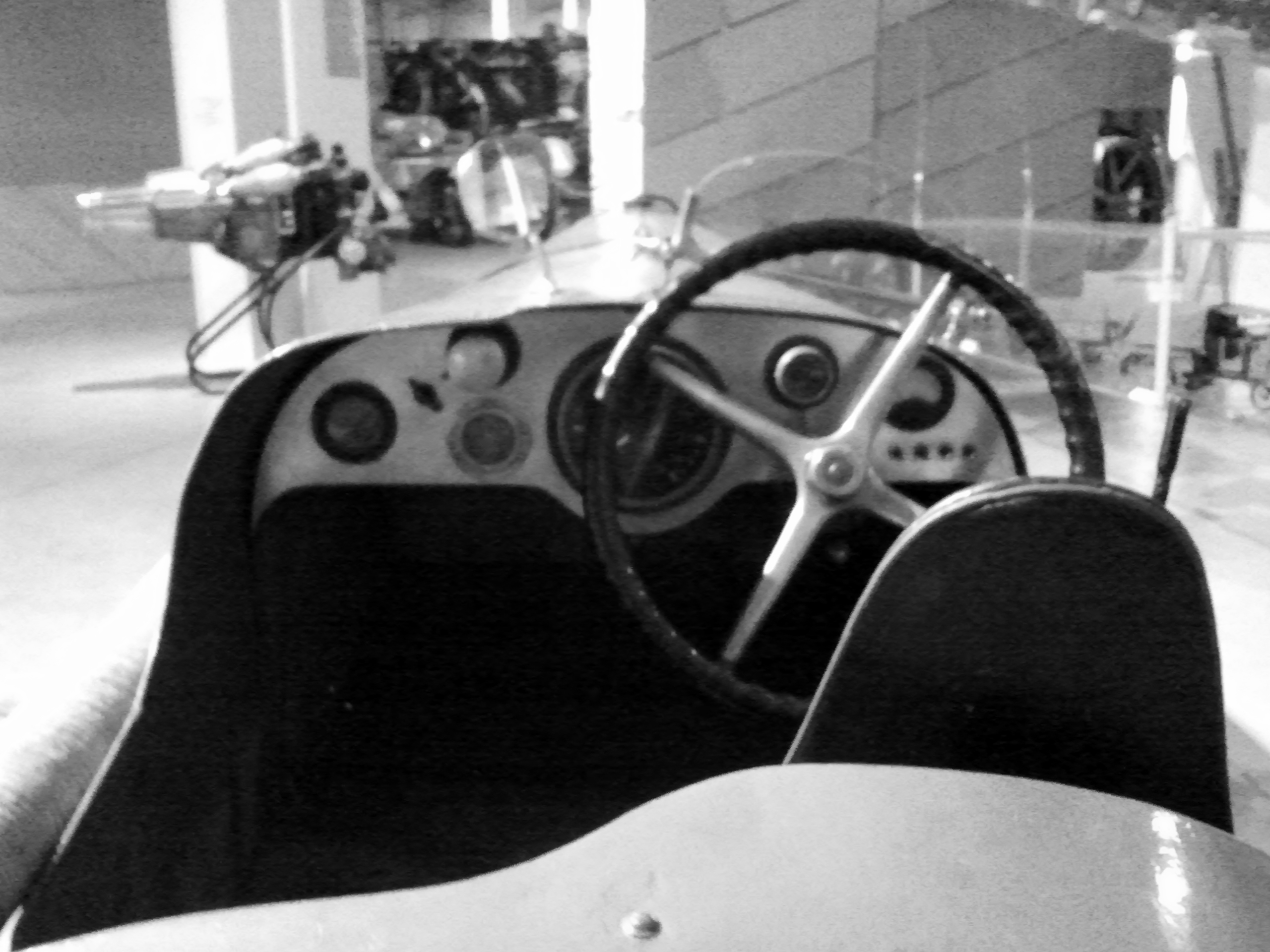

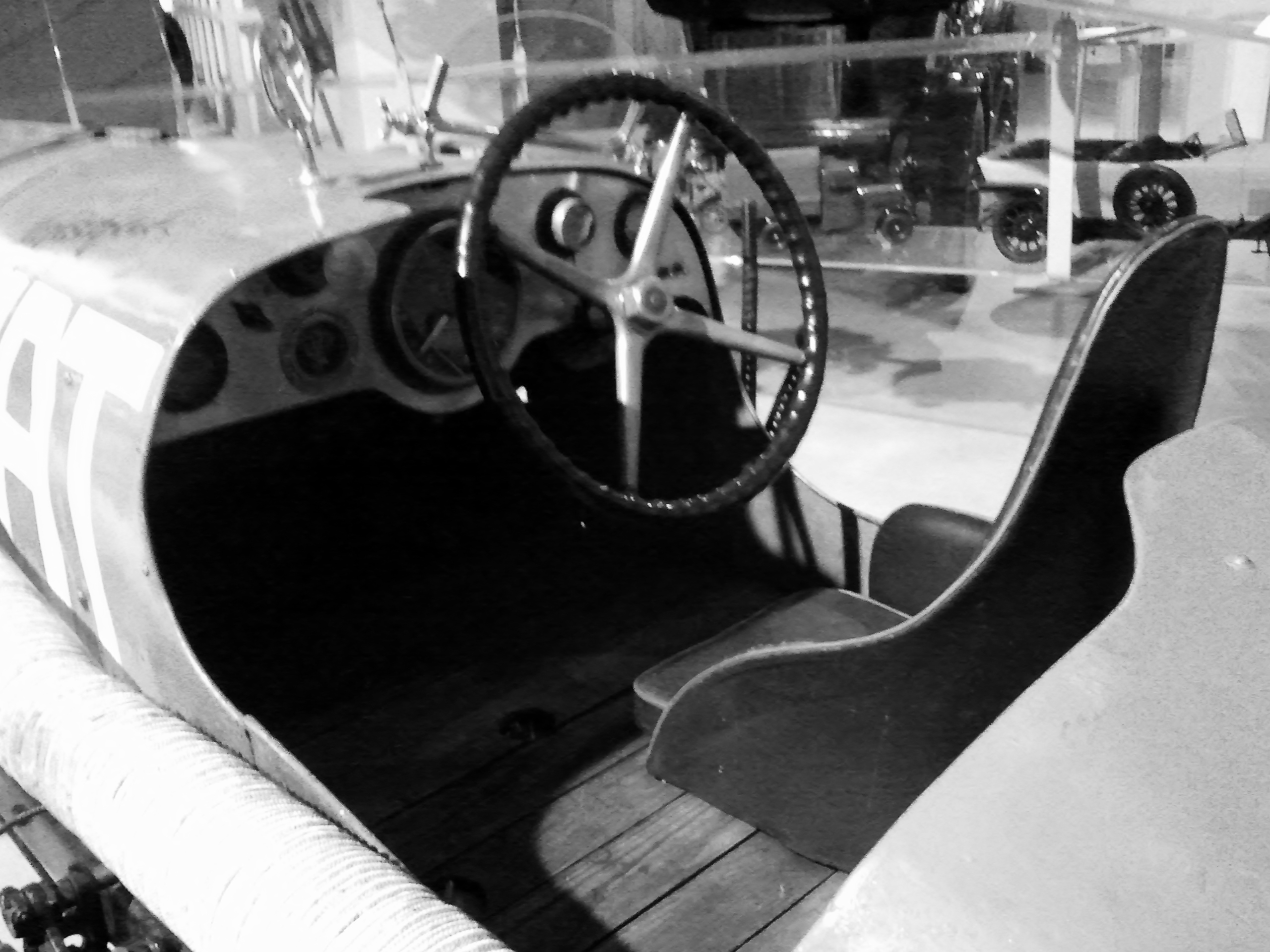

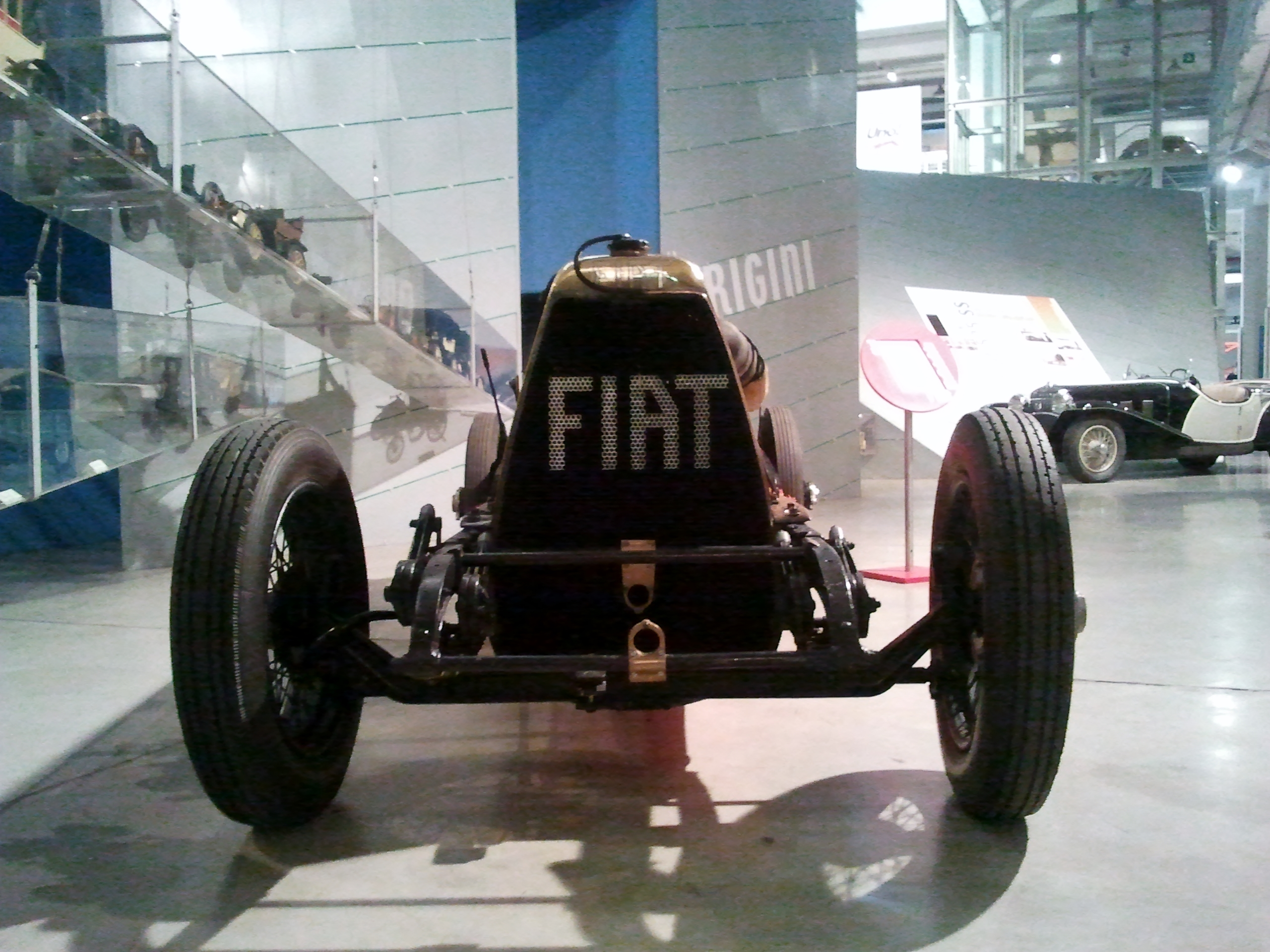

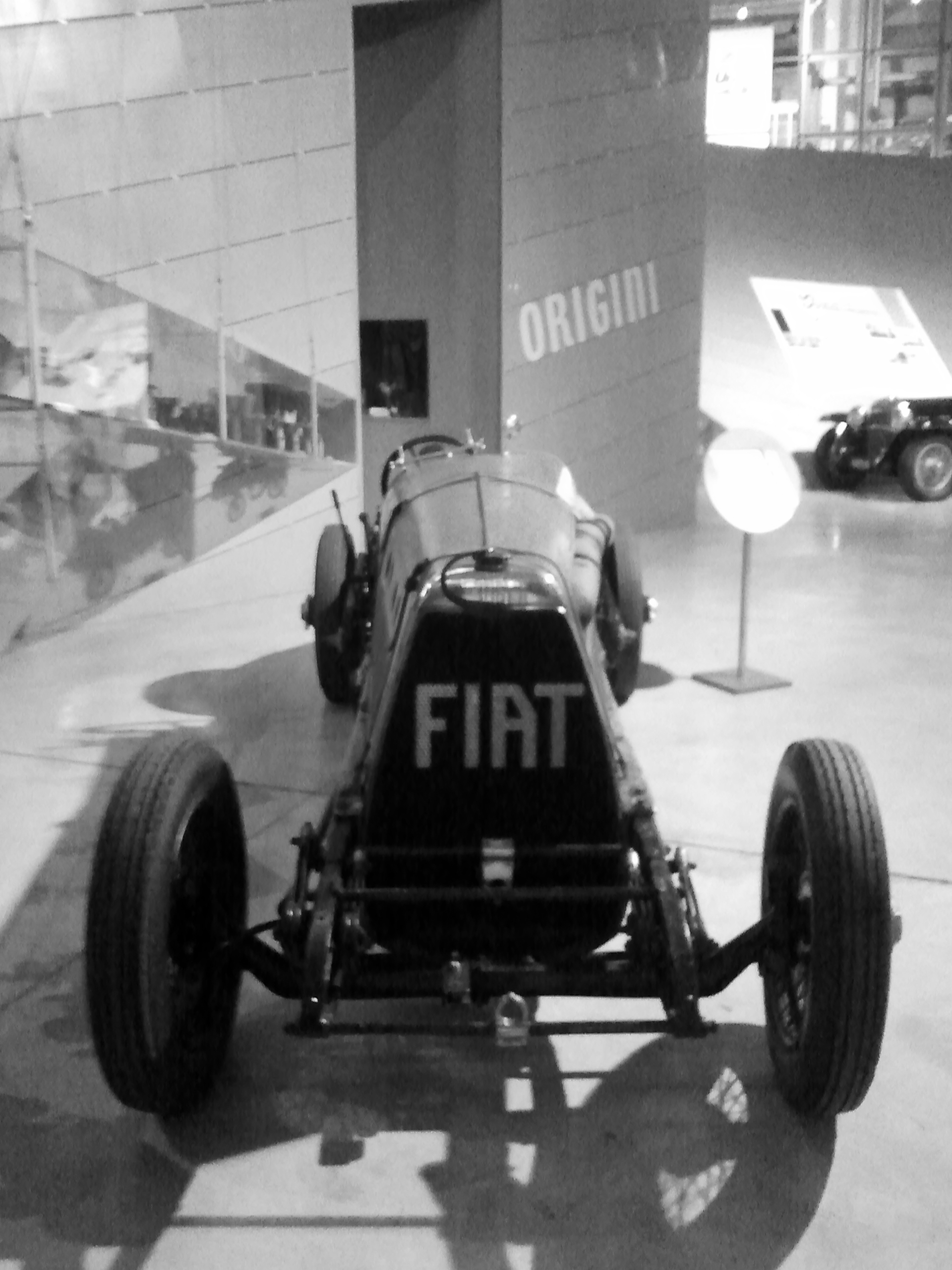

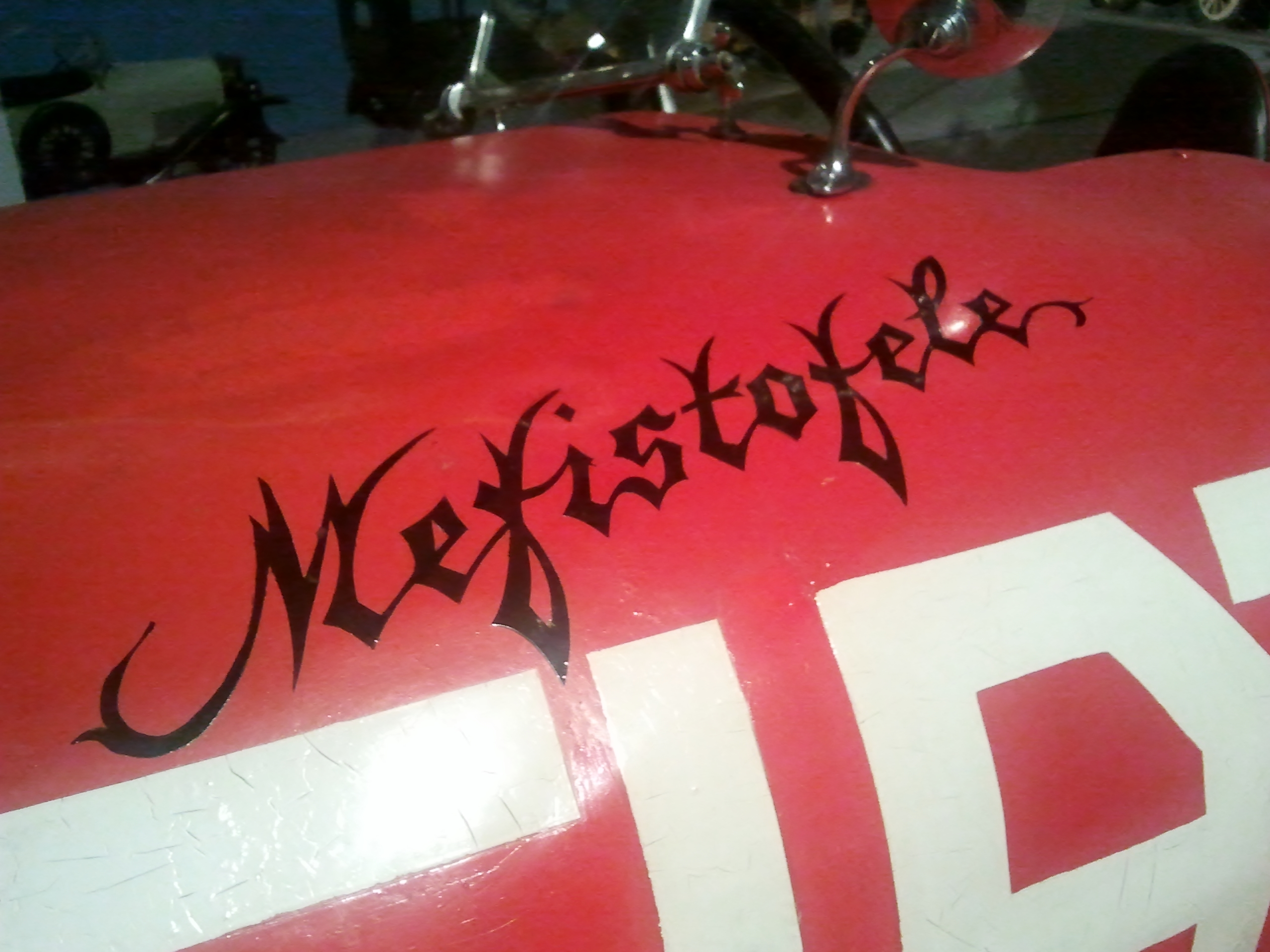

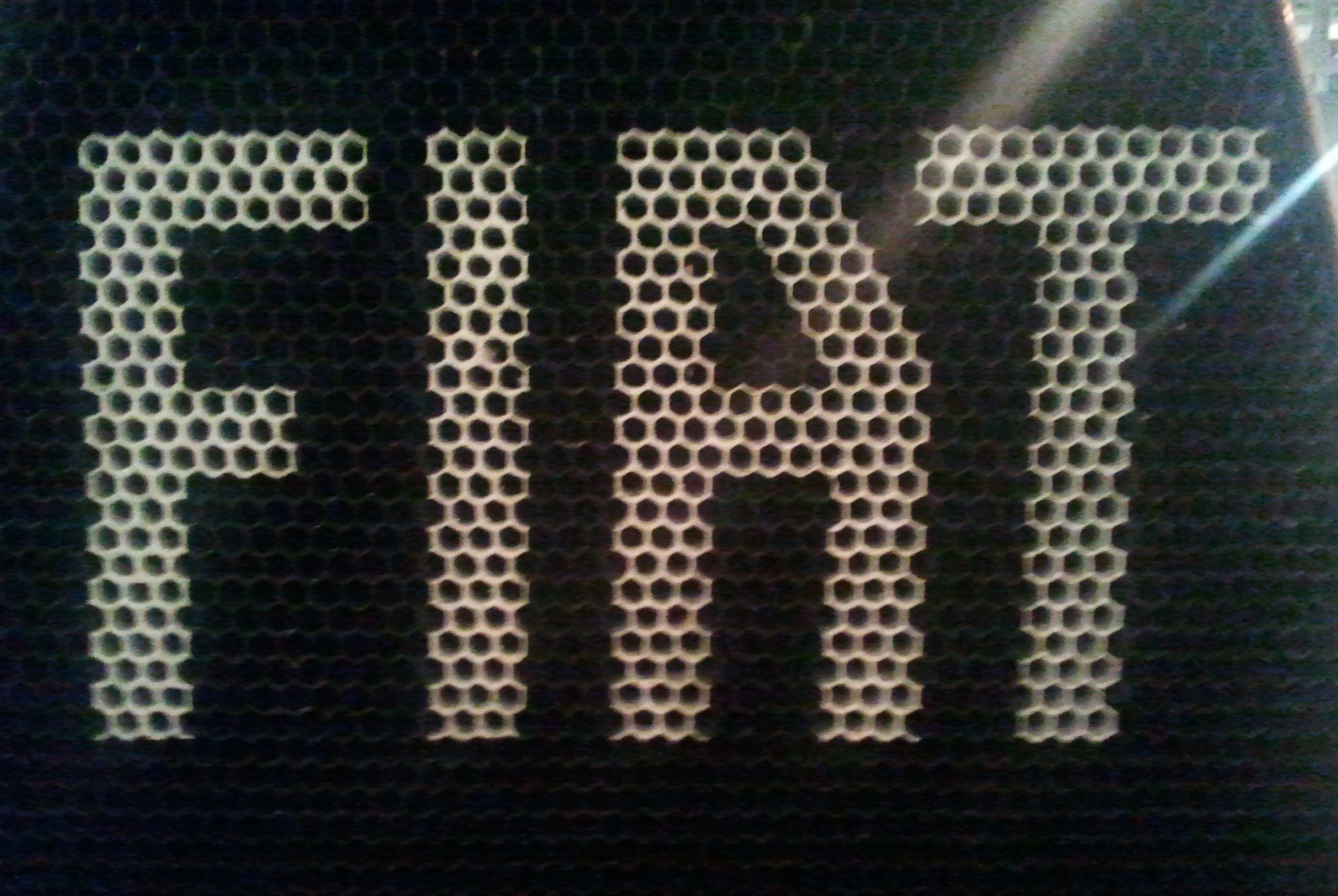

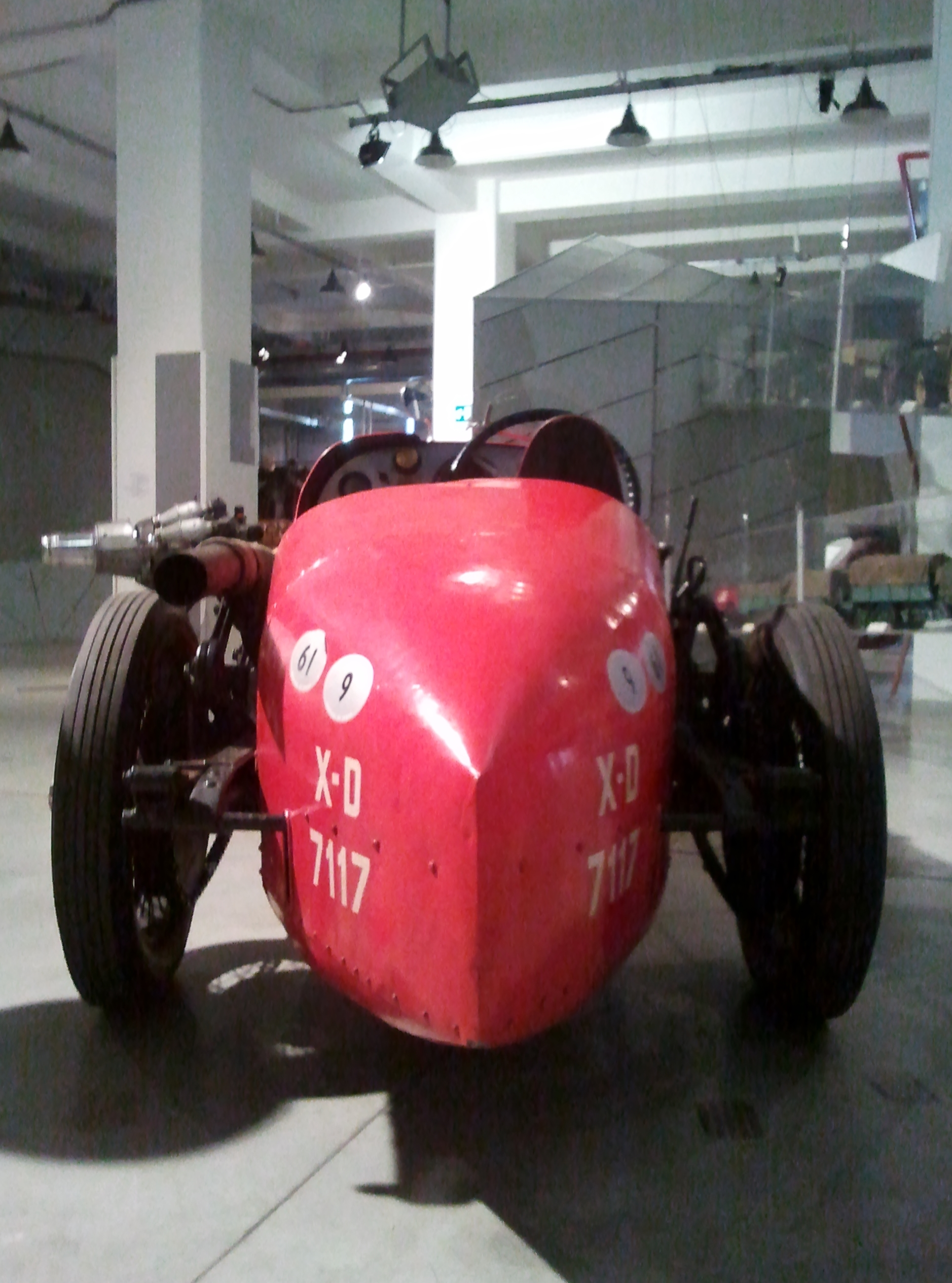

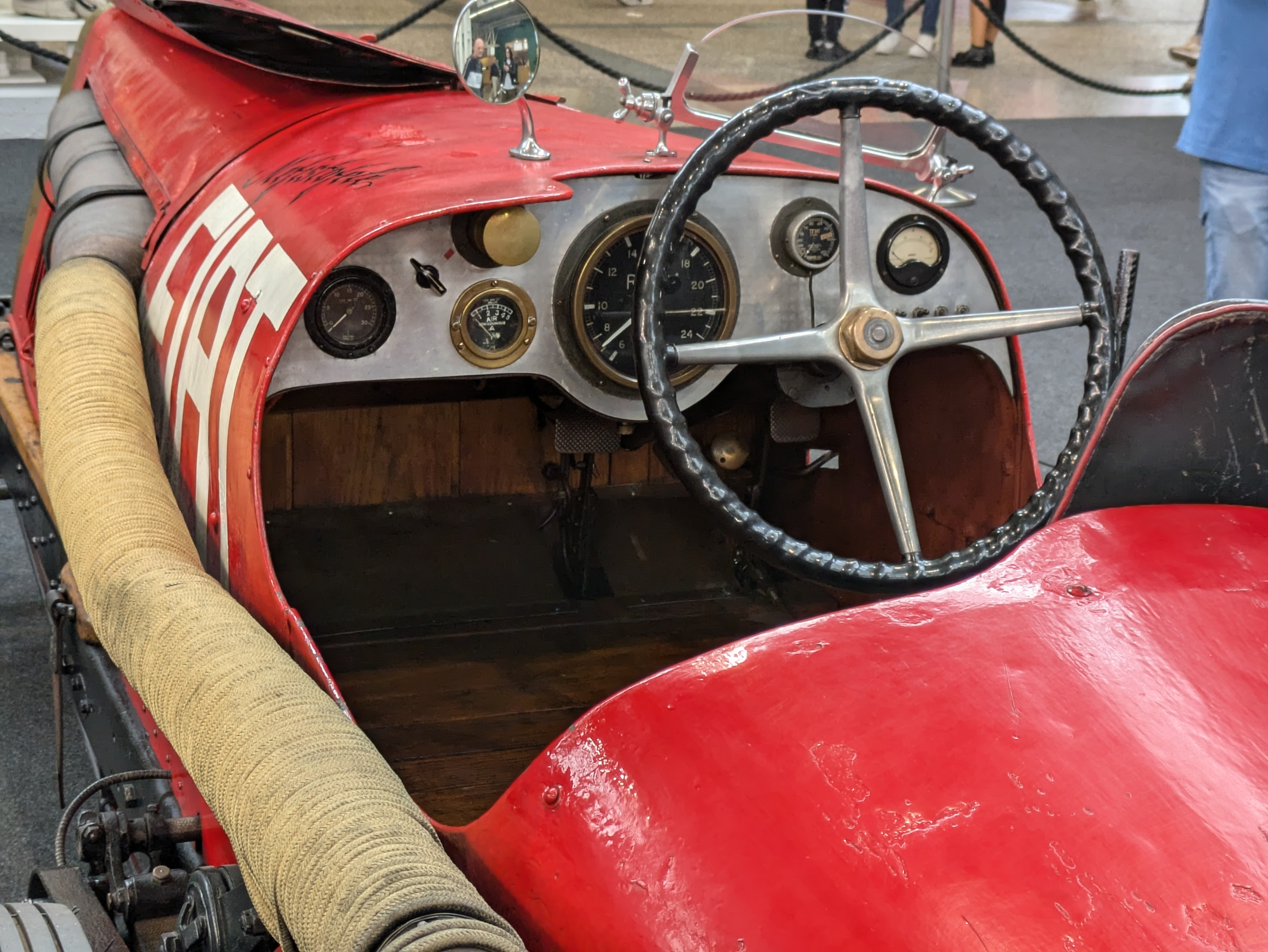

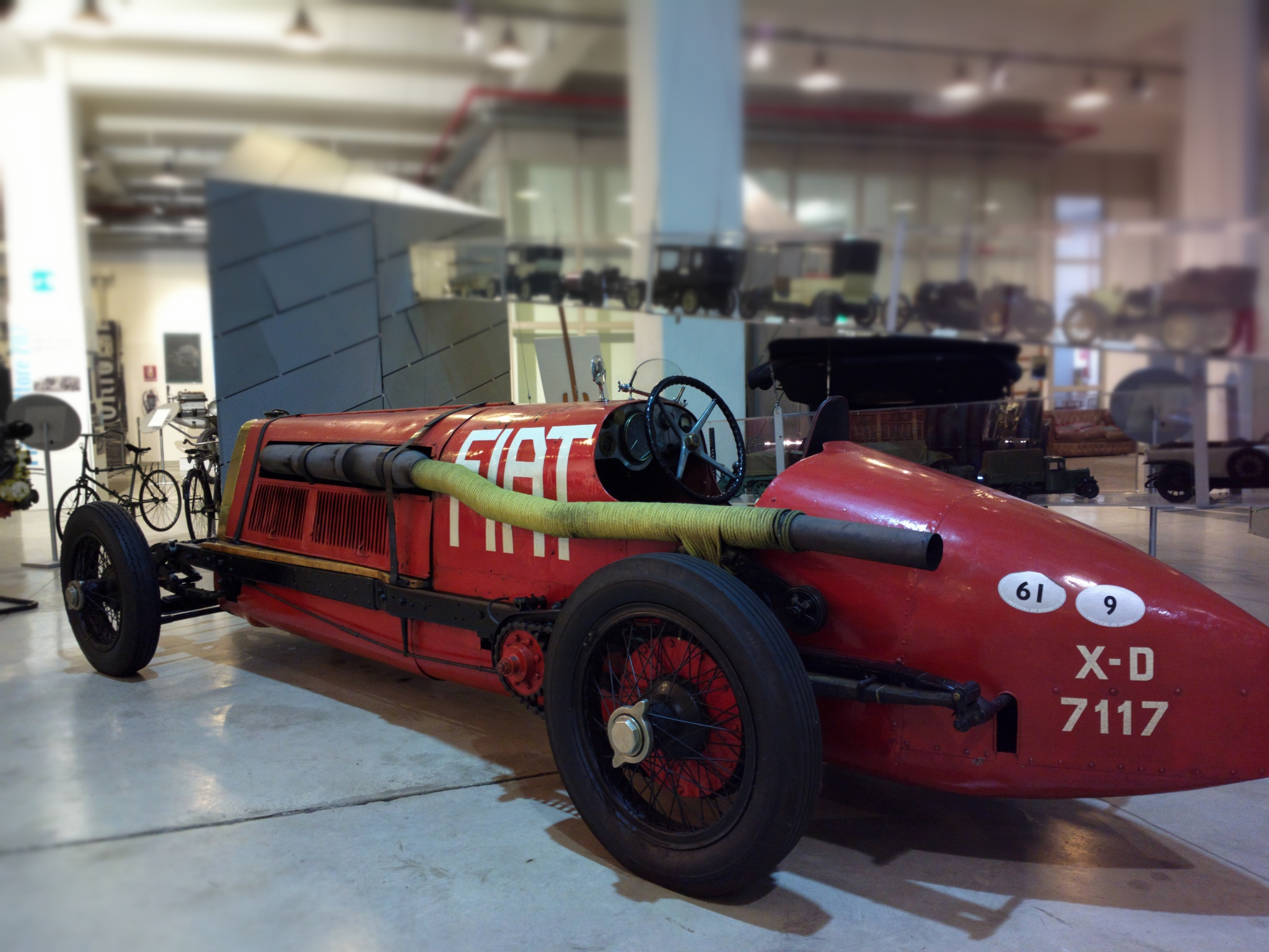
