= Ernest Eldridge =

British racing driver (1897–1935)

- Born: Ernest Arthur Douglas Eldridge; 18 July 1897 Willesden, Middlesex, England
- Died: 27 October 1935 (aged 38) Kensington, London, England

Champ Car career
- 2 races run over 1 year
- First race: 1926 Indianapolis 500 (Indianapolis)
- Last race: 1926 Sesquicentennial Classic; Heat #1 (Atlantic City)
Wins	Podiums	Poles
0	0	0

Ernest Arthur Douglas Eldridge (18 July 1897 – 27 October 1935) was a British racing driver who broke the world land speed record in 1924. His was the last land speed record set on an open road.

== Early life ==
Eldridge was born on 18 July 1897 at Willesden in Middlesex to a wealthy family. His father was a successful bill discounter. (Note: A form of debt factoring, or money lending. The discounter buys invoices that will fall due in the future, at a discounted price, but pays immediately. They then receive their own full payment in the future.) Educated at Harrow School he quit while in the 6th form to go to the Western Front, in the First World War. Eldridge joined the British Red Cross Society and Order of St John of Jerusalem, possibly as an ambulance driver. He may have also served in the French Artillery.

Eldridge married Majorie M. Tooth in 1915 at Brentford in Middlesex; she died before the Second World War. A bigamist, he married a second time in 1925 to a French woman named Marie, whom he eloped with while still married to Marjorie.

Not much is known about the years between 1918 and 1921 when Eldridge reappeared at Brooklands. There are unconfirmed myths about him flying with Louis Zborowski. He was a pilot, surviving a crash in a B.E.2e at Brooklands in September 1922. He learned to fly in a Sopwith Grasshopper at Brooklands and finally received his pilot's licence (Number 7944) on 21 August 1923 at Stag Lane Aerodrome, Edgware. His licence lists his profession as Automobile Engineer.

=== Racing career ===
The early part of Eldridge's racing career is littered with failures of large, often aero engined, racing cars. His first racing appearance was in 1921 with a rare chain-driven Isotta Fraschini which was lapping at more than 90 mph.

In 1922, Eldridge startled the Brooklands crowd by appearing with a 240 horsepower (180 kW) Maybach aero engine in his 1907 Isotta Fraschini chassis, which had been stretched to accommodate the giant power plant. This 20-litre racer had a tiny two-seater body made by Jarvis of Wimbledon and caused something of a sensation, even when monstrosities were not uncommon in motor racing circles. It won its first race at more than 101 mph (163 km/h) but over all was not terribly successful. He sold it to another British racing driver, L C G M Le Champion.

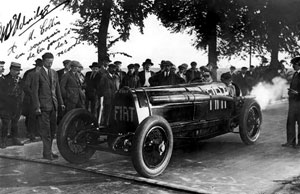
Eldridge and the Mephistopheles at the start of the record attempt

Eldridge then turned to a 10-litre Fiat, which he drove with some success. With the proceeds he bought Mephistopheles, and embarked on his famous escapades. In October 1923 at Brooklands: "E. A. D. Eldridge set up new figures for the half-mile (standing start) world's record by covering the distance in 23.17secs. (77.68 miles an hour) on his giant 350 horse-power F.I.A.T." and taking the World Land Speed Record on 12 July 1924 at Arpajon, France, at an average of 146,013 mph (234,985 km/h) over the flying kilometre. In October 1924, at Montlhéry: "Mr. Eldridge covered 210 kilometres 230 metres in the hour, and at one time attained 218 kilometres (over 136 miles) an hour. This is claimed to be a world's record."

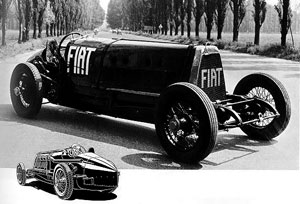
The Mephistopheles posed for a promotional photo many years later (after some major modifications to its bodywork)

In 1925, Eldridge sold Mephistopheles to Le Champion and decided to enter the world of Grand Prix motor racing with cars of his own design, the Eldridge Specials. Based on Amilcar chassis with Anzani engines, these cars were entered at many races for the 1925 and 1926 seasons including the Brooklands 200, The San Sebastian, the L'ACF and the Italian GPs. He also entered two cars in the 1926 Indy 500, no doubt tempted by the prize money. He drove one car with Douglas Hawkes in the other.

While in the United States, Eldridge tried a Miller 122, and was so impressed he entered it into AAA-sanctioned Indy car races at Rockingham Park, Atlantic City Speedway and the Altoona Speedway – qualifying only for the latter – before returning to Europe to break records at Montlhéry. Whilst attempting speed records over the Christmas Holidays the front axle disintegrated, the car somersaulted, and Ernest was left with serious head injuries and the loss of an eye.

Once recovered, Eldridge continued to take records with other cars, including a Chrysler at Montlhéry, and then became the "Record Attempt Manager" for Capt Eyston.

In 1929, they meant to co-operate in a joint assault on the 750cc world records with a French-built Ratier. When it was ready for testing at Montlhéry, with Eyston away racing, Eldridge took the wheel. As Eyston recalled in his book Flat Out, "I heard afterwards what a comic sight this had been. Ernest is by no means slim, and here he was sitting in a little bucket seat on the bare chassis, the wind ballooning his trousers and coat. He, I was told, looked like a true 'Bibendum' as he manipulated the chassis round Montlhéry."

The Ratier project was scrapped, though, as the two friends became involved with the first-ever MG record car EX120. With Eyston at the wheel, it was the first 750cc car in the world to set records at more than 100 mph. Eldridge played an important part in the development of the pioneering EX120. He designed a counterbalanced crankshaft as part of the tuning work on the engine, before EX120's first visit to Montlhéry in December 1930. It took several records at speeds up to 87 mph (140 km/h). Eldridge told Cecil Kimber of MG that the car would have to be supercharged, if it were to have any chance of heading off a rival 100 mph attempt by Malcolm Campbell in a blown Austin Seven.

Kimber agreed, and Eldridge supervised the work as the engine was fitted with one of Eyston's Powerplus superchargers. And he was there at Montlhéry as Eyston's signaller, "Uncle Ernest stood out in the middle of the straight opposite the timekeepers' box with a little flag in his hand. He would raise or lower it in accordance with the lap speed I was putting up."

Eyston had also been successful attacking records over longer distances with Hotchkiss and Panhard machinery, as well as the Rolls-Royce-engined, Speed of the Wind record breaker, that Eldridge helped design and went to Bonneville to manage the record attempt. It was whilst returning from a trip to Bonneville to supervise the record attempts that Eldridge contracted the pneumonia that he subsequently died from in Kensington. He was 38 years old.

Eldridge was considered a colourful character. He spent the family fortune on gambling, racing and flying. He once lost £60,000 playing "chemmy", in Monte Carlo in 1922, on the turn of one card.

== World Land Speed Record 1924 ==
- Speed over 1 km −146.01 mph 234.98 km/h
- Speed over 1 mile −145.89 mph 234.79 km/h
- Driver – Ernest A. D. Eldridge.
- Car – FIAT Special Mephistopheles II (Mefistofele)
- Date – 12 July 1924.
- Place – Arpajon, France.
- Engine – Fiat A.12
- This was the last land speed record set on a public road.

== Motorsports career results ==
=== Indianapolis 500 results ===
Year	Car	Start	Qual	Rank	Finish	Laps	Led	Retired
1926	26	23	89.777	25	19	45	0	Tie rod
Totals						45	0	

Starts	1
Poles	0
Front Row	0
Wins	0
Top 5	0
Top 10	0
Retired	1

== See also ==
- Land speed record
