= Wolseley Hornet =

Wolseley Hornet was the name of two different British vehicles produced under the Wolseley Motors Limited nameplate.

- Wolseley Hornet six, six-cylinder lightweight saloon, coupé, sports and racing cars produced in the 1930s.
- Wolseley Hornet (Mini), a variant of the Mini produced by the British Motor Corporation.
