= MG L-type =

MG L-Type "Magna"

Overview
- Manufacturer: MG
- Production: 1933–1934; 576 made
- Assembly: Abingdon-on-Thames, Berkshire, England

Body and chassis
- Class: sports car

Powertrain
- Engine: 1087 cc Straight-6

Chronology
- Predecessor: MG F-Type Magna
- Successor: MG N-Type Magnette

MG L1 "Magna"

Overview
- Production: 1933–1934; 486 made

Body and chassis
- Body style: 4-seat roadster Continental coupé Salonette

MG L2 "Magna"
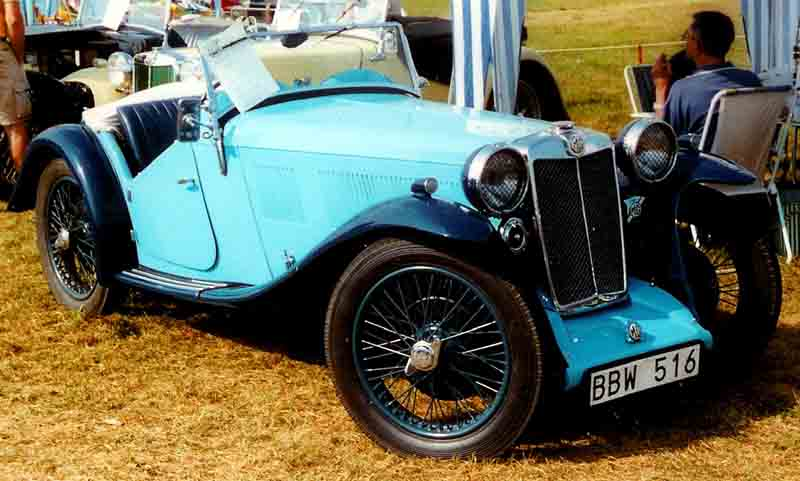

Overview
- Production: 1933–1934; 90 made

Body and chassis
- Body style: 2-seat roadster

The MG L-type (also known as the MG Magna) is a sports car that was produced by the MG Car company in 1933 and 1934.

This 2-door sports car used a smaller version of the 6-cylinder overhead camshaft, crossflow engine which now had a capacity of 1086 cc with a bore of 57 mm and stroke of 71 mm and produced 41 bhp (31 kW) at 5500 rpm. It was previously fitted in the 1930 Wolseley Hornet and the 1931 MG F-type Magna. Drive was to the rear wheels through a four-speed non-synchromesh gearbox. The chassis was a narrower version of that used in the K-type with suspension by half-elliptic springs all round with rigid front and rear axles.

The car had a wheelbase of 94 inches (2388 mm) and a track of 42 inches (1067 mm).

The brakes, which were larger than in the J2, were cable-operated, with 12-inch (300 mm) drums all round.

The body kept the sloping radiator seen on the F-Type, but the car now had sweeping wings, and had cut-away doors. The body tubs of the L2 and J2 are practically identical rear of the bonnet.

The L1 was the four-seat, coupé and saloon version and the L2 the 2-seater. The coupé, or Continental Coupé as it was called, was available in some very striking two-tone colours but was a slow seller, and the 100 that were made were available for a long time after the rest of the range had sold out. As a rarity, it is now a highly desirable car. The bodies for the small saloon or salonette version were not made by MG, but bought in from Abbey.

The L-Type was a successful competition car, with victories in the 1933 Alpine Trial and Brooklands relay race.

When new, a L1 tourer costed £299 and a Continental Coupé costed £350.
