= Jappic =

1925 English two-seater cyclecar

The Jappic, first entered at Brooklands on the Easter Monday meeting of 1925, was a tiny two seater cyclecar that had a 344cc JAP motorcycle engine. The car was designed by H.M.Walters and built by the coachbuilders Jarvis of Wimbledon. The frame was made from the wood ash with 3/32 inch steel flitch plates and tubular cross-members. It had expanding rear brakes on the rear, but no front brakes. The wheels where shod with 650x65 motorcycle tyres, which were attached by a chain-driven axle to a two-port overhead valve 74x80mm single-cylinder JAP engine via a three-speed gearbox (chain-driven from the engine).

Walters managed to break the Class J flying mile record in the car at a speed of 70.33 mph, but by 1926, the original engine was replaced with a 495cc JAP engine. The car was then obtained by Mrs Gwenda Stewart, who changed the cars name to Hawkes-Stewart and refitted the original 344cc engine. Unfortunately the car was destroyed in a garage fire at Autodrome de Linas-Montlhéry in 1932.

Jarvis of Wimbledon intended to build replicas, but none are believed to have been produced. In 2019, two replicas appeared at the Vintage Revival Montlhéry - one was built in the UK and the other in New Zealand.

== See also ==
- List of car manufacturers of the United Kingdom
