= Wolseley Hornet six =

Wolseley Hornet
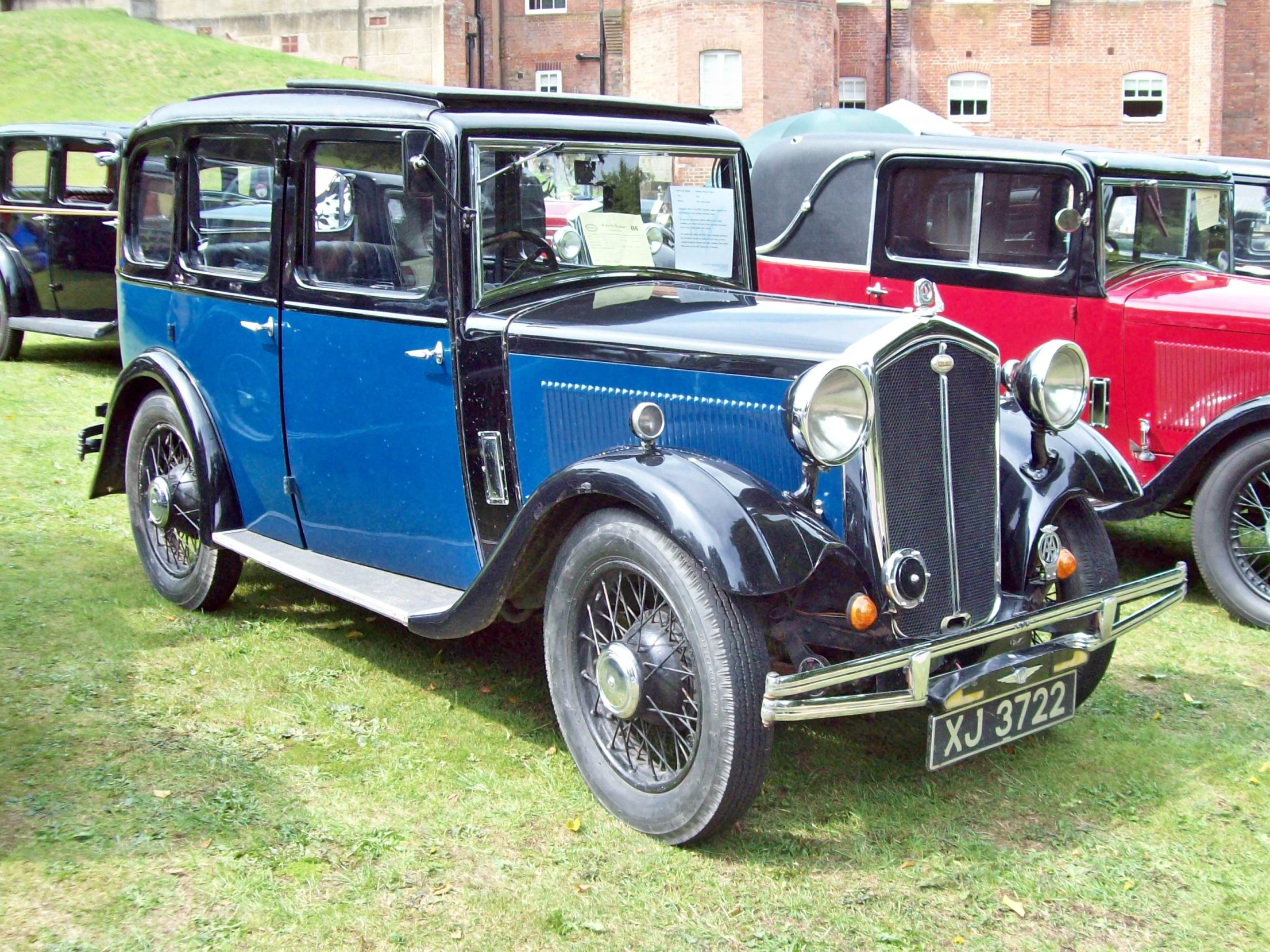
- SOHC 6-cylinder 4-door 6-light saloon registered October 1932

Overview
- Manufacturer: Wolseley Motors Limited
- Production: 1930–1936; 31,686 made
- Assembly: United Kingdom: Birmingham, England (Ward End Works)

Body and chassis
- Body style: 2-door 4-light saloon; 4-door 6-light saloon; 2-door Occasional Four coupé; open 2-seater; chassis for customer's choice of coachwork; Special chassis for customer's choice of coachwork

Powertrain
- Engine: single-overhead-camshaft inline six-cylinder: 1,271 cc (78 cu in) and Special; 1,378 cc (84 cu in) used in standard cars only; 1,604 cc (98 cu in) Special only
- Transmission: A single-plate dry-type clutch and three-speed gearbox form a single unit with the engine; there is a ball pattern central change-speed lever; the propeller shaft is open with fabric disc joints; the spiral bevel driven back axle is three-quarter floating and has a two-pinion differential gear; announced September 1931, a 4-speed gearbox with a quiet third gear.; announced August 1934, single-plate clutch, 3-speed preselector gearbox (finger control by steering wheel) an additional lever controls forward neutral and reverse, freewheel and Startix; by September 1935, single-plate dry clutch with cushion drive and torsional spring dampers, four-speed centrally controlled gearbox, synchromesh on third and top.

Dimensions
- Wheelbase: 90.5 in (2,299 mm); 95 in (2,413 mm); track: 42 in (1,067 mm); 45 in (1,143 mm); 48 in (1,219 mm)
- Length: 133 in (3,378 mm); 141 in (3,581 mm)
- Width: 51 in (1,295 mm); 55 in (1,397 mm)
- Height: 63 in (1,600 mm); unknown
- Kerb weight: 977.95 kg (2,156 lb) 19¼cwt; 990.65 kg (2,184 lb) 19½cwt

Chronology
- Successor: Wolseley 12/48

The Wolseley Hornet is a six-cylinder twelve fiscal horsepower lightweight automobile which was offered as a saloon car, coupé and open two-seater as well as the usual rolling chassis for bespoke coachwork. Produced by Wolseley Motors Limited from 1930 until 1936, the Hornet was unveiled to the public at the end of April 1930. Wolseley had been bought from the receivers by William Morris in 1927.

This car's small six-cylinder engine, described by Motor Sport magazine as a miniature six, reflected the brief vogue for less vibratory 6, 8, 12 and 16 cylinder engines soon superseded by an improved flexible engine mountings. Because of the overhead camshaft engines, cars built on their Hornet Special chassis developed a positive reputation on the road and in club competition.

The initial offering was something of a quart in a pint pot, tiny but relatively powerful for its size. Furthermore, four passengers might be fitted into the very lightly constructed car. However the market soon required more room and more comfort and the car's nature changed. This was countered by making and selling the Special with a more highly tuned engine. The last Hornet was replaced, following acquisition of Wolseley by Morris Motors, with Morris's badge-engineered Wolseley 12/48, announced 24 April 1936.

== Bodies ==
=== 1930 ===
==== Initial offering ====
Announced at the end of April 1930 — though ownership was quite separate from Morris Motors — the first Wolseley Hornet was in effect a 2-door 4-seater Morris Minor saloon fitted with an extended engine bay to make room for a small six-cylinder engine in place of the four-cylinder unit that was normal for this size of car.

The new Hornet was supplied as an enclosed four-seater two-door saloon with coachbuilt body or, for £10 less, fabric body; as an open two-seater or as a bare "rolling" chassis for the owner's choice of coachwork.

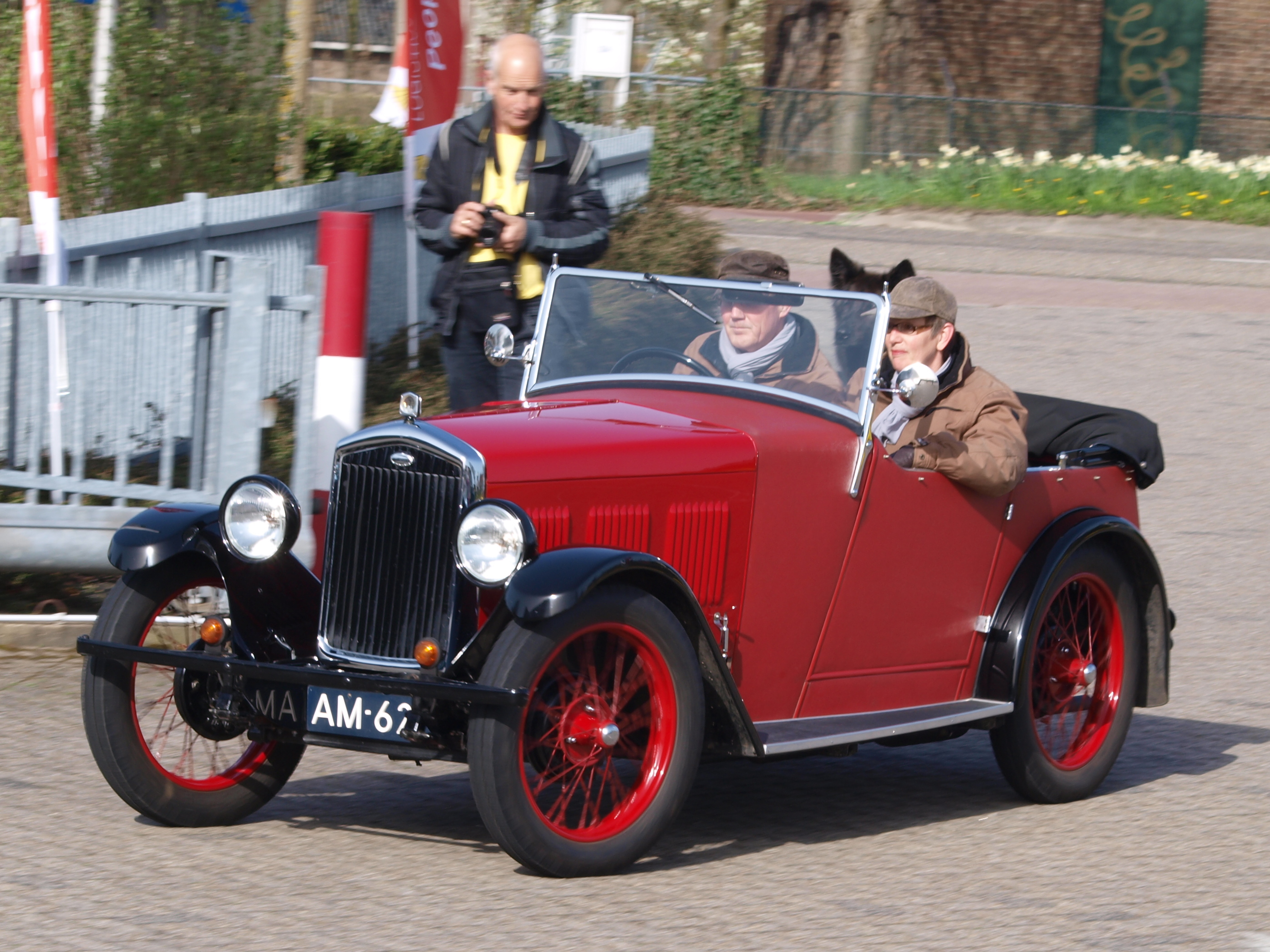
Open 4-seater fabric body by Jarvis 1930, saloon's 5-stud wire wheels

==== Revision ====
In the autumn of 1930 the lack of body room and difficult access to the interior was recognised by Wolseley and new four-seater two-door coachwork was provided which was considerably longer and wider with wider doors.

Sunshine roofs were now made available. Separate front bucket-type seats were adjustable and Wolseley claimed the back seat gave plenty of leg and headroom for two adults. The four windows slid open and had locking devices. Safety glass was fitted throughout.

==== Catalogue 30 April 1931 ====
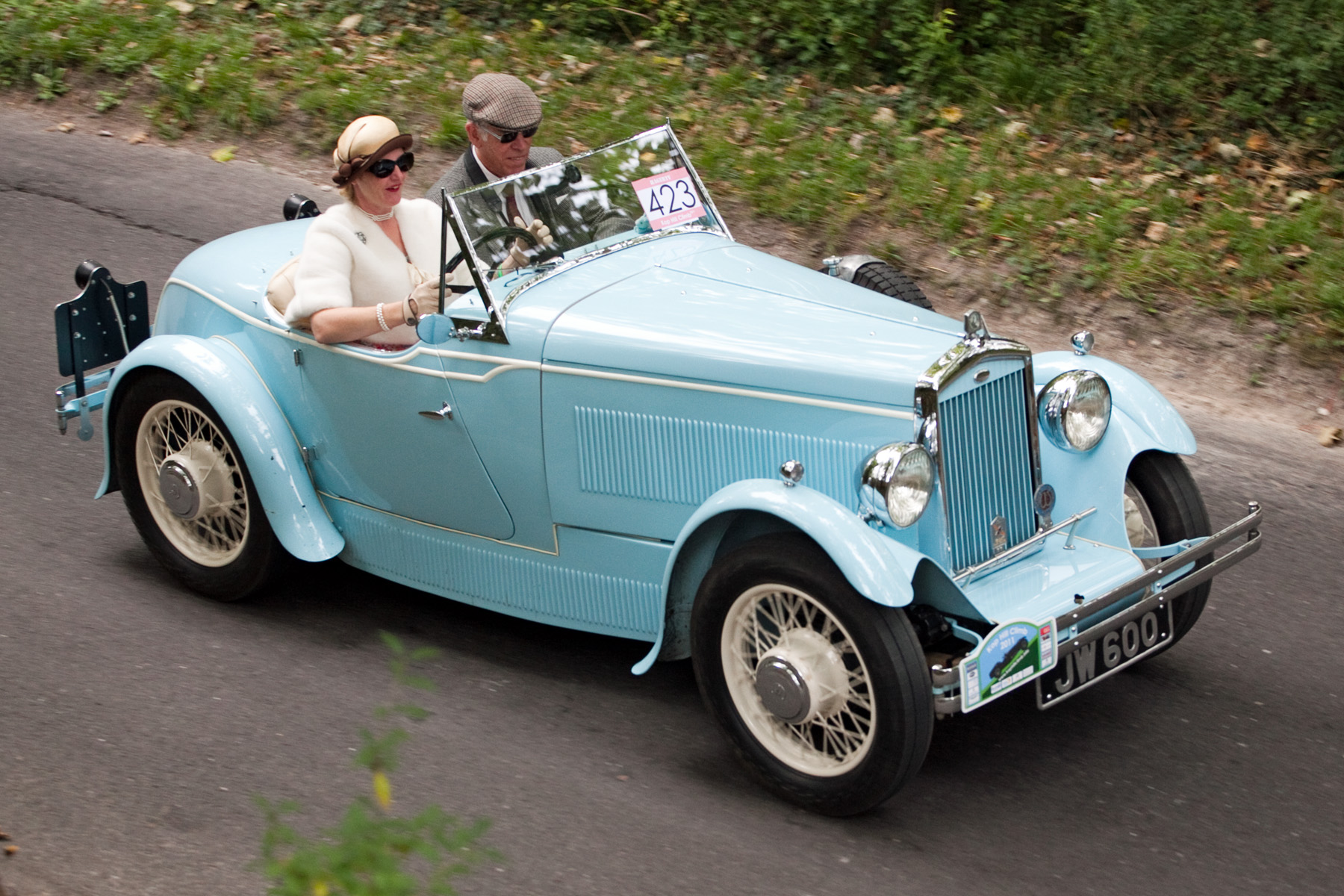
Open 2-seater by Swallow 1931 at Kop Hill climb 2012, Magna wheels

Initial offering remained available

Fabric saloon £175
Coachbuilt saloon £185

Revision model with longer and wider body:

Fabric saloon £185
Fabric sunshine saloon £187.10.0
Coachbuilt sunshine saloon £195
Semi-sports two-seater £198
Two-seater coupé £215

==== Coachbuilders ====
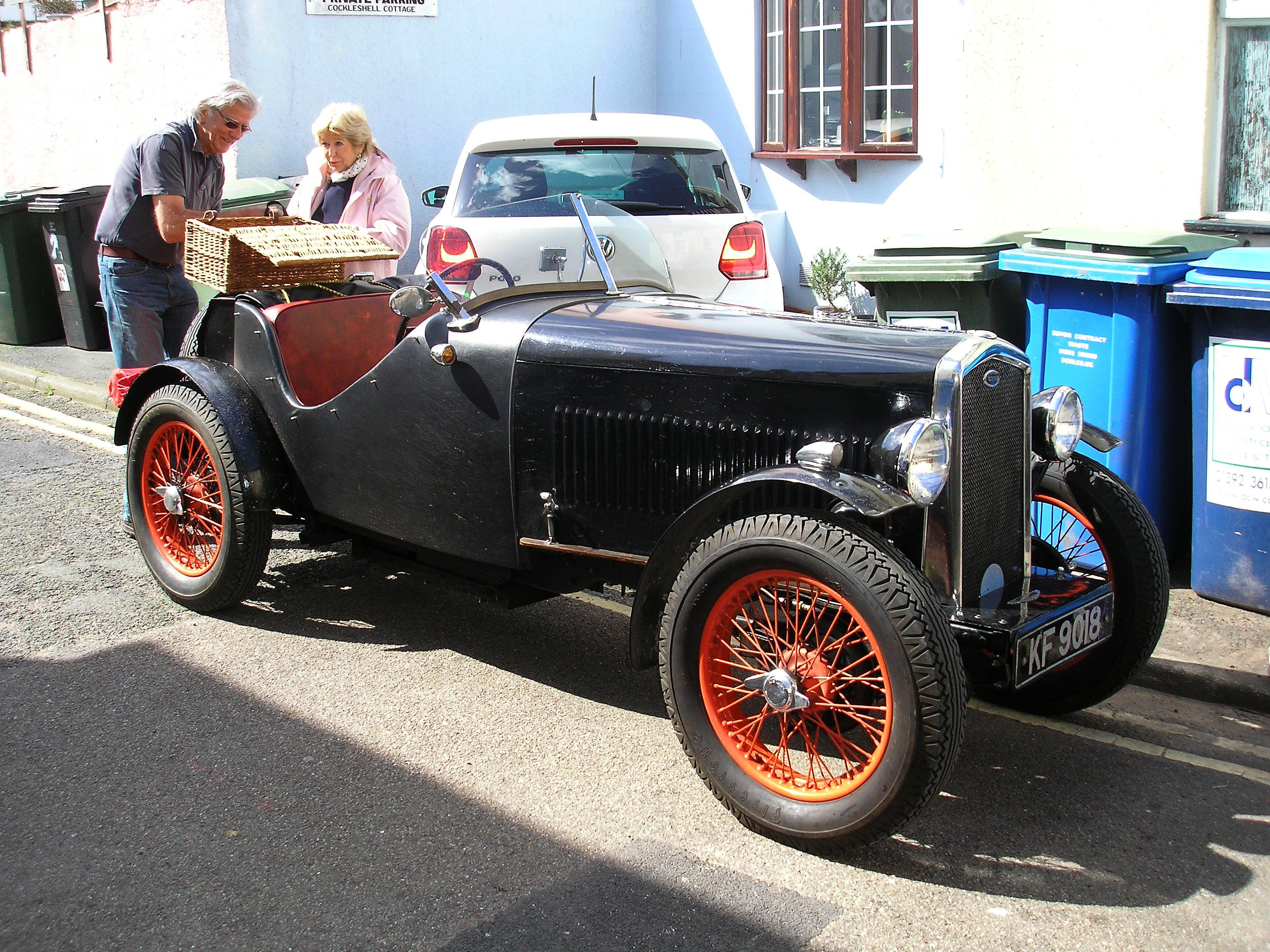
Open 2-seater Rudge-Whitworth centre-lock knock-on wire wheels

Some of the popular bodies were made by:

- Swallow Coachbuilding (S. S.): open 2-seater £220, 4-seater £225
- Boyd-Carpenter: (Note: Francis H Boyd-Carpenter, 47 West End Lane, Kilburn NW6) open 2-seater £232.10, fixed head coupé £250
- Abbey: open 4-seater £235
- Eustace Watkins: open 4-seater £220, EW Tickford coupé £245

=== 1931 Olympia Motor Show ===
Responding to demand Wolseley presented a much roomier four-door saloon with wind-up windows.
One month before the Motor Show agents from all over the country were called to Birmingham to see the new Hornet four door saloon. A changed design for the engine's drive to the camshaft allowed a shorter engine which could now be placed further forward in the chassis and the bodywork could be more capacious. A silent third four-speed gearbox was added to the car's equipment.

The Autocar published its road test on announcement day, 25 September 1931. Autocar's testers were pleased with the result of the engine being moved 8 inches (20 cm) forward, weight distribution was better and the ride more comfortable for all passengers, no tossing them about over appalling surfaces and no pitching at all. Weight and wind resistance were increased but at 64 miles per hour this car was faster than the last Hornet tested. The performance of the new third gear in the new four-speed gearbox was much admired. "Altogether the new Wolseley Hornet is a fascinating small car. It offers a very high degree of comfort and convenience, possesses an excellent performance, yet runs with complete refinement. It gives an extraordinary combination of economy and an ability to do all that the majority of owners can possibly require."

A 21st century reader might better understand the gear-changing difficulties of early motoring compounded by the lack of synchromesh gearboxes by reading this excerpt from that 1931 Autocar roadtest: "To obtain the best out of the car it is desirable to use the gearbox sensibly, and to change down early. . . . This is a matter of small consequence, for the reason that the gear change is extraordinarily easy to accomplish between top and third without paying much attention to the use of the accelerator pedal. All the same the gear change responds just as readily to the more orthodox style of handling, and a little practice with double-clutching and finding the right pauses soon gives a quiet mastery."

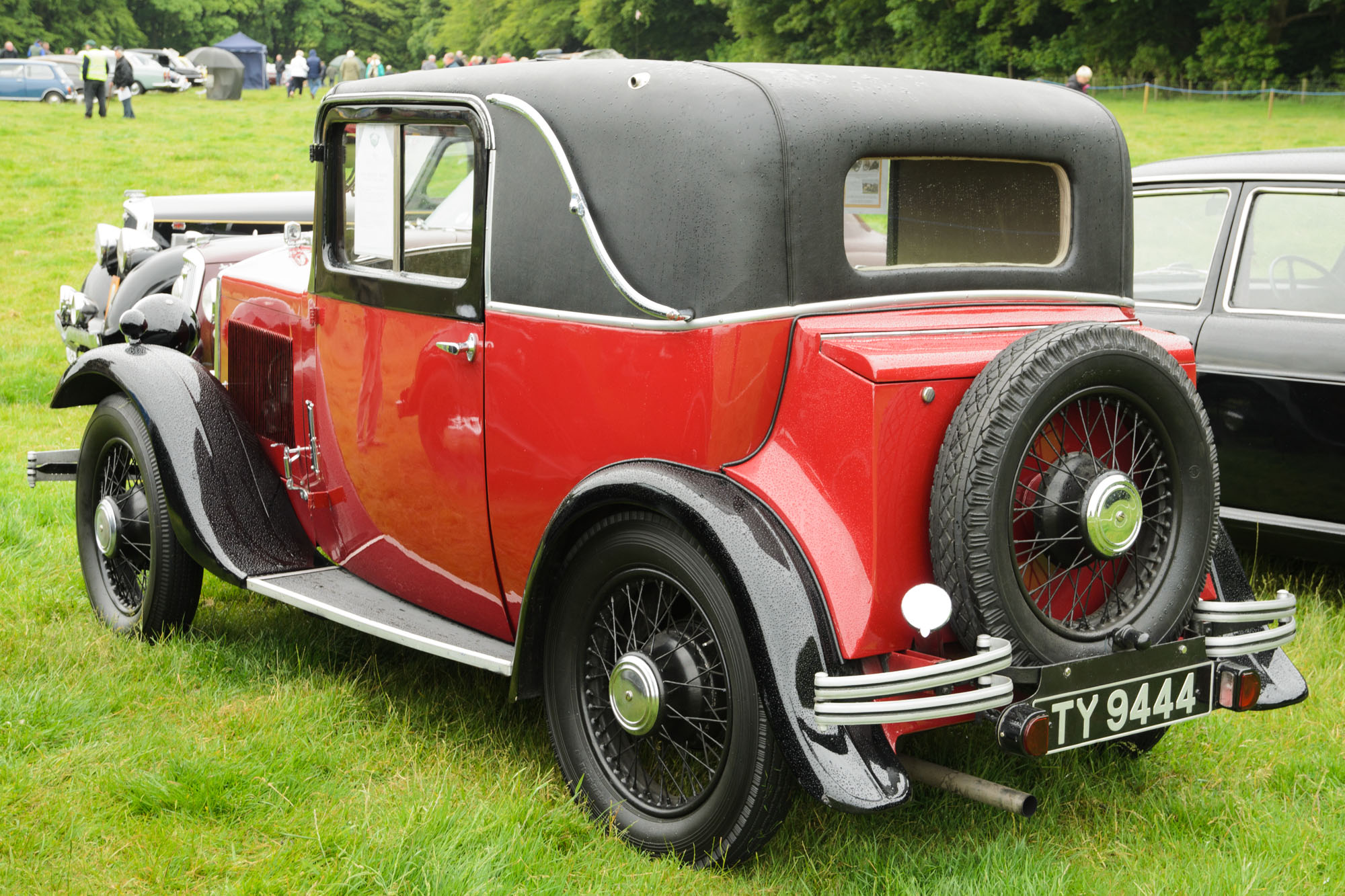
1932 Occasional Four coupé

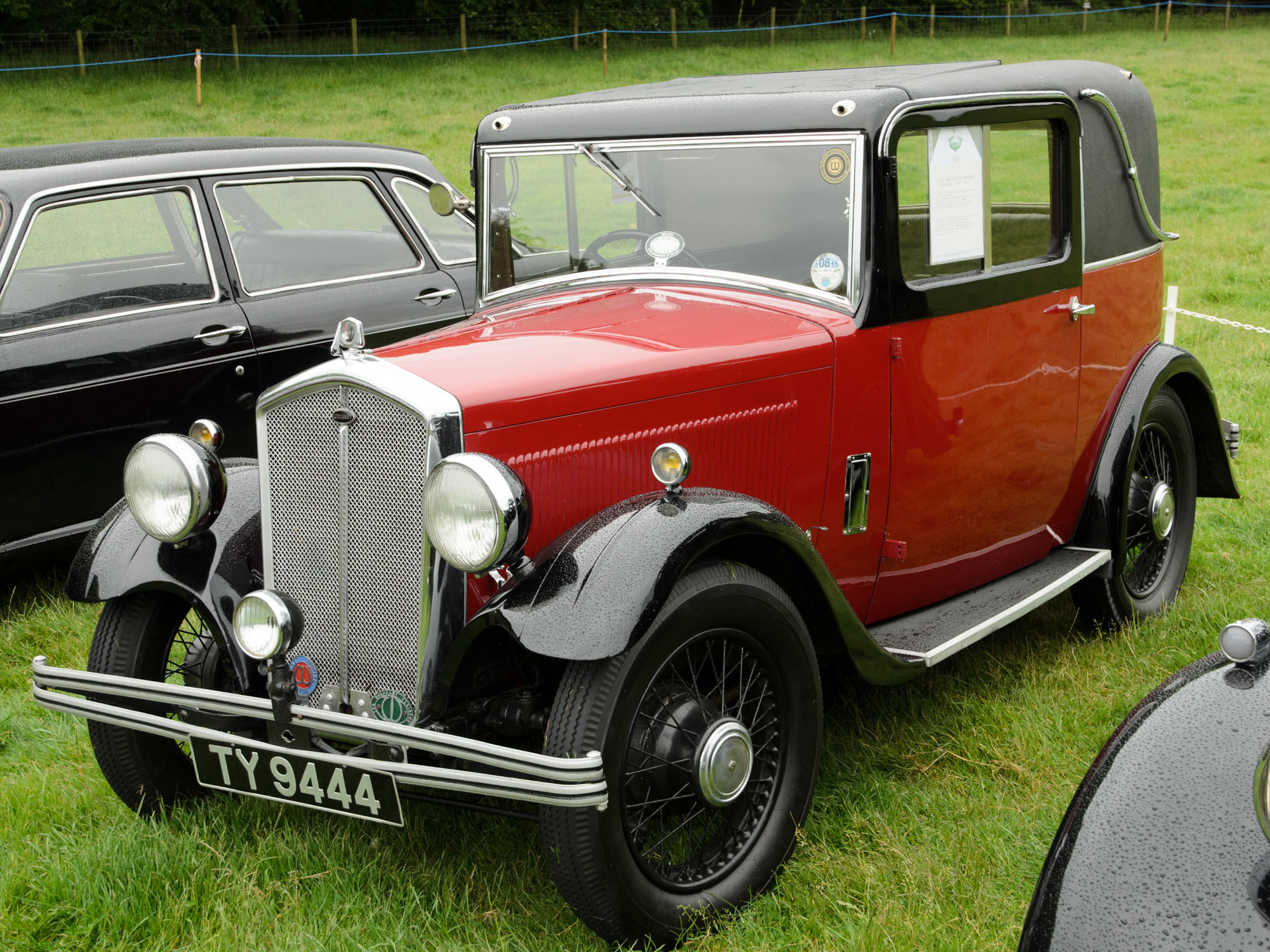
1932 Occasional Four coupé

=== 1932 ===
During 1932 Wolseley added two and four-seat coupés to the range.

The display at Olympia was two four-door six-light saloons with soft leather upholstery and sliding roofs.

==== Special chassis ====
On 18 April 1932 a Special chassis with engine and other modifications was also made available but only as a chassis, at a cost of £175 and it made for itself an enduring reputation. More information is provided below.

=== 1933 ===
New Hornets were shown at Olympia in the autumn beside the continuing 7 ft 6½ins wheelbase four-door saloon and occasional four coupé which were not fitted with freewheel but did have the quiet-third four-speed gearboxes with new synchromesh on all but first gear.

Two new Hornets shown were: a four-door saloon and an occasional four on a new 7 ft 11ins wheelbase. The engines of the new cars had a single camshaft drive in place of the earlier two-stage chain drive. Propeller shaft universal joints were now metal in place of their fabric predecessors. On the freewheel cars the frame was now underslung at the rear. Automatic restarting of the engine was provided. Electric direction indicators were now built into the body pillars.

=== 1934 ===
A new form of gearbox was announced in the autumn of 1934, preselective with a finger-operated lever below the steering wheel. By the driver's left hand was a small additional lever which selected forward neutral or reverse. A standard type of clutch was operated by the first part of the pedal's travel. The rest of the travel changed the gears as preselected. A freewheel was provided on the indirect ratios though it could be locked out on second gear to provide engine-braking.

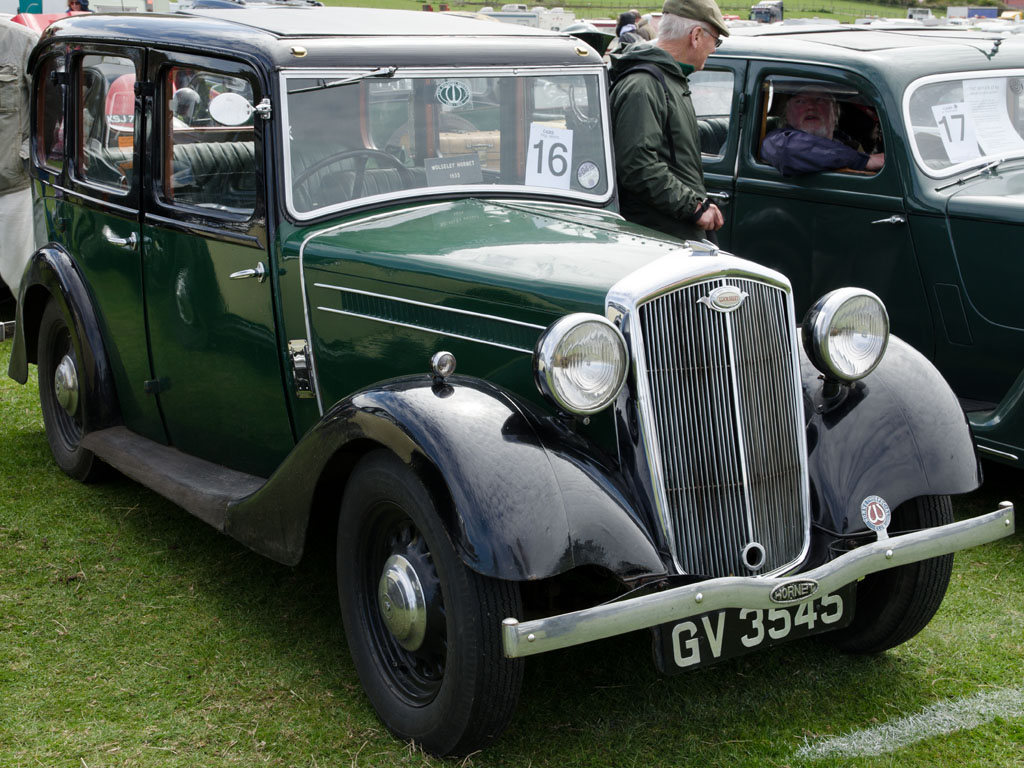
New Hornet registered July 1935

=== 1935 ===
New more powerful, roomy and pleasing in design Hornet (and Wasp) models with special easy clean wheels were shown to the motor trade at a Birmingham gathering on 29 April 1935. The range was rationalised to a standard saloon and coupé. But six weeks later, in the middle of June, it was announced that W R Morris had sold Wolseley to Morris Motors and the transfer of ownership would take effect on 1 July 1935. So the 1935 Hornet saloon and coupé were replaced just twelve months later by a badge-engineered Morris Twelve labelled Wolseley 12/48.

== Post mortem ==
When launched in 1930 the Hornet came with a UK retail price of £175 and could be seen as a competitively priced small saloon with unusually brisk performance but the saloon gained in overall weight and lost the well judged weight distribution that gave the early Hornets much of their market-place appeal.

== Wolseley engines ==
Hornet

Overview
- Manufacturer: Wolseley Motors Limited

Layout
- Configuration: single overhead camshaft in-line six
- Displacement: 1,271 cc (78 cu in); 1,378 cc (84 cu in); 1,604 cc (98 cu in)Special
- Cylinder bore: 57 mm (2.2 in); 57 mm (2.2 in); 61.5 mm (2.42 in)Special
- Piston stroke: 83 mm (3.3 in); 90 mm (3.5 in); 90 mm (3.5 in)Special
- Cylinder block material: cast-iron, aluminium pistons, Dural connecting rods, fully balanced four-bearing crankshaft
- Cylinder head material: detachable with valve gear intact
- Valvetrain: slightly inclined overhead valves are operated by a single overhead camshaft driven: by spiral bevel gears; by two-stage chain drive; by automatically tensioned single roller chain
- Compression ratio: unknown, (6:1 Special)

Combustion
- Fuel system: S.U. carburettor (Special—twin) fed by: gravity from tank on dash; Autovac from tank at rear (Sept1931); electric pump from rear
- Fuel type: petrol
- Oil system: full pressure lubrication Oil cooler fitted to Special
- Cooling system: water circulated by centrifugal impeller and the radiator has thermostatically controlled shutters; shutters removed after first year

Output
- Power output: 35 bhp at 4500 rpm; 41 bhp at 4500 rpm Treasury rating 12.08hp; 48 bhp at 4500 rpm Special Treasury rating 14hp

At the beginning of the 1920s Wolseley had been UK's largest motor manufacturer, over-expansion had been the downfall of the owners of the business but Wolseley retained considerable technical expertise. One result was the very successful overhead camshaft six-cylinder engine sold in this car. Wolseley Aero Engines Limited was formed around 1931 specifically to separate out and capitalise on this expertise.

When Wolseley Motors Limited was transferred to Morris Motors Limited on 1 July 1935 this part of its business was set aside by W. R. Morris (Lord Nuffield) and put in the ownership of a newly incorporated company, Wolseley Aero Engines Ltd, and remained his personal property. It later became Nuffield Mechanizations Limited.

William Morris began to capitalise on Wolseley's products with the 847 cc Wolseley designed engine he put in his 1928 Morris Minor. The Hornet engine can be viewed as a 1928-design Morris Minor engine with two more cylinders. A re-design of both engines by Morris engines branch led to a less costly product for the Morris range, a side-valve replacement for the two-seater Morris Minor at first called the Morris Minor S.V. and announced at Christmas-time 1930. The Minor's OHC engine continued in production for the rest of the Minor range, lastly in the Morris Family Eight. The full Minor range was replaced by the side-valve 918cc Morris Eight range announced in late August 1934.

A 1378cc side-valve version of the 6-cylinder was used in the Morris Ten Six announced in August 1933.

=== 1930 ===
The new car was given a small (1271cc) six-cylinder engine with a single overhead camshaft. The overhead camshaft followed the Wolseley custom begun by their 2-litre 16/45 6-cylinder engine announced in September 1926 — just before the change of ownership.

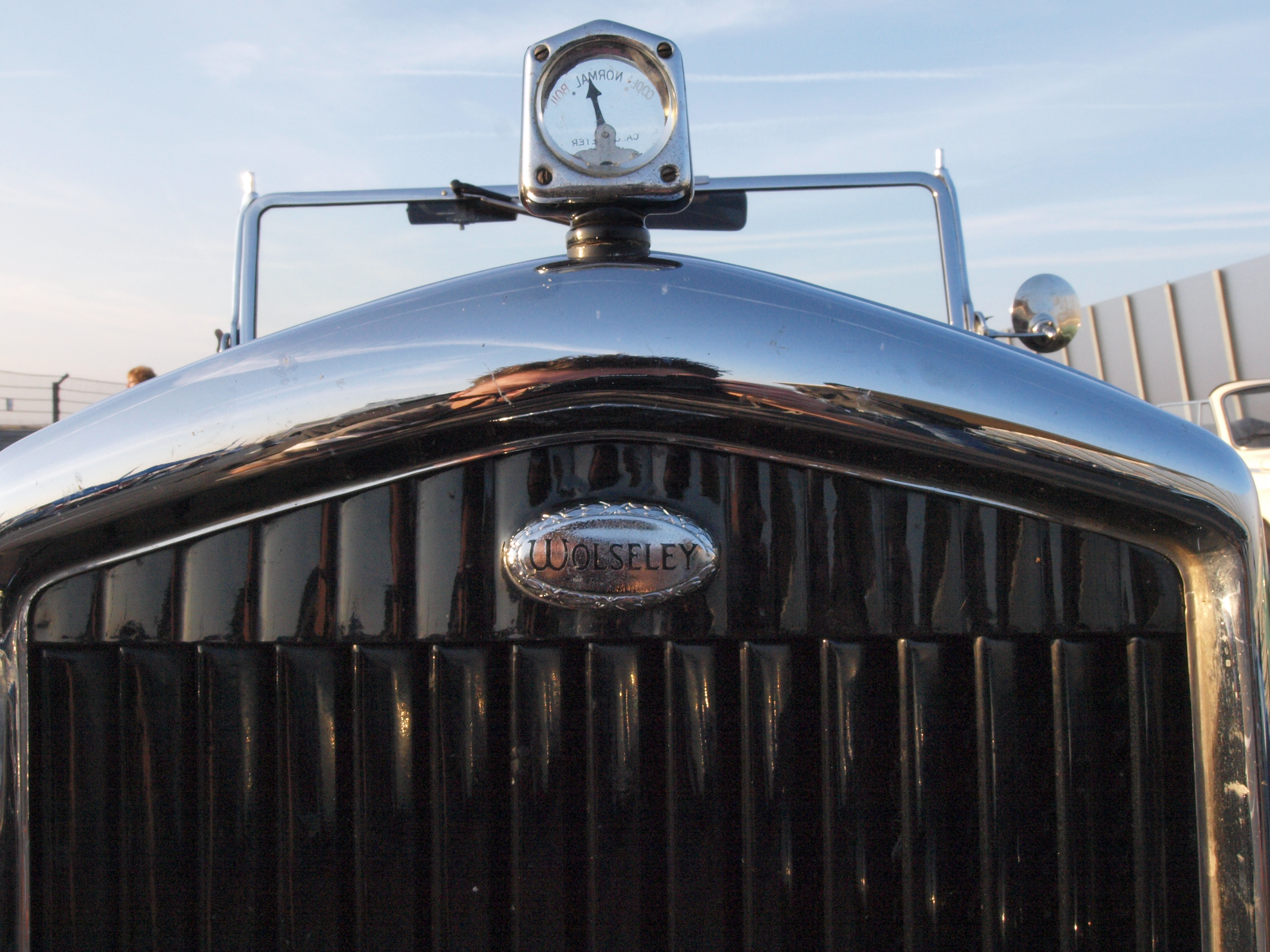
Initial offering's thermostatically controlled radiator shutters

=== 1931 ===
For the new four-door saloon announced in September 1931 the engine was modified to make it shorter and it was moved forwards on its chassis. The dynamo had been moved from in front to the side of the engine and the drive to the camshaft was now by two-stage chain instead of by the dynamo and spiral bevel gears. Meanwhile, the same basic design, but with the original vertical dynamo, was supplied by Wolseley to MG (which was also at this time owned by William Morris but not as part of the Morris Motors empire). The nearest match to the 1932 Hornet Special was the MG F-type, although the chassis details were less similar, as the Hornet had hydraulic brakes while the MG had cable operation.

=== 1934 ===
To match the new body the engine grew to 1378 cc by lengthening its stroke from 83mm to 90mm yet it remained a 12 hp engine for tax purposes.

Hornet Special chassis were made available with the same long stroke and with a larger bore — increased from 57mm to 61.5mm — and a swept area of 1604 cc. This enlarged engine was from Wolseley's New Fourteen.

== MG engines ==
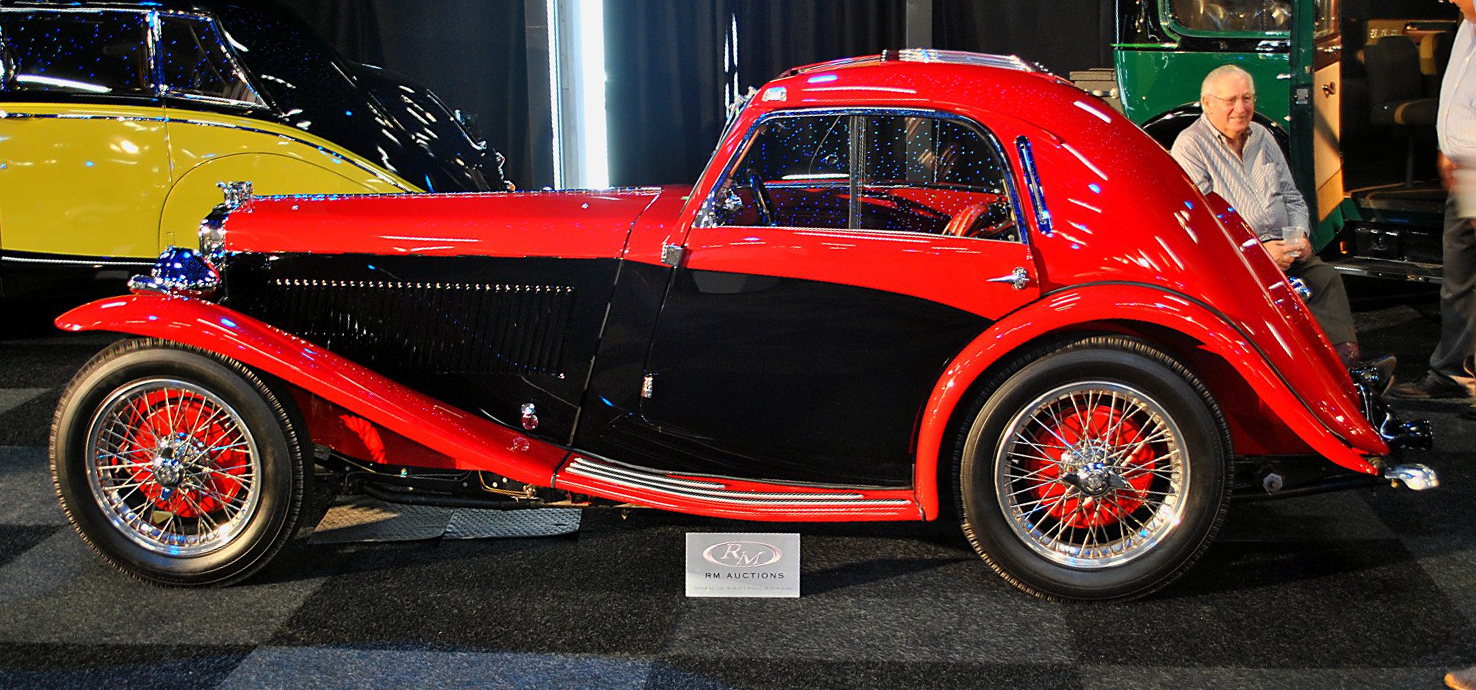
MG Magnette Airline Coupé powered by a 1271cc Wolseley Hornet 6

This engine was also used in the MG F-type and MG L-type Magnas, and MG K-type and MG N-type Magnettes and a side-valve version in Morris cars.

There are significant differences between the MG F-type engine and that of the Hornet Special.

These differences mean that most of the connections and pipework are not remotely interchangeable between Hornet Specials and F-types.

Differences Between Wolseley and MG Engines
	Wolseley Hornet	MG F-, L-, K-, and N-type
Camshaft Drive	Camshaft drive by two-stage chain drive, dynamo driven by V-belt	Camshaft driven by vertical dynamo
Cooling	Water pump driven from skew gear (which also drives the distributor)	Cooling by thermosyphon only
Manifolds	Two inlet manifolds, three exhaust connections, branched exhaust system	Inlet and exhaust in one manifold, running up, forwards and down
Oil feed	Oil feed from steel sump includes pre-filter (under suction)	Oil drawn from cast light-alloy sump
Brakes	Hydraulic brakes	Cable brakes

== Brakes suspension steering ==
Steering is by worm and wheel, both back and front springs are half elliptical controlled by Luvax hydraulic dampers, Lockheed hydraulic brakes are fitted on all four wheels.

The standard specification includes twelve volt lighting, electrically operated dip and switch headlamps and combined stop and tail lamps, single wiper with provision for a second blade, chrome finish on all bright parts, petrol gauge, bumpers etc. There is a concealed spare wheel under a metal cover on the back panel and a fold-down luggage grid.

Although from September 1931 the saloon was supplied with a four-speed gear box the two-door cars remained available but with three-speed gearboxes.

== Saloon road test ==
=== 1933 ===
The Times correspondents commented in early 1933: "the car has a large body space for its wheelbase with its engine well forward and body taken considerably behind the rear axle and good leg elbow and head room had been provided within it. . . . The large windscreen might open farther. . . . The scuttle can be ventilated, the front seat is adjustable. Below the temperature indicator on the radiator there is an illuminated name badge. The engine was fairly quiet, . . . though third is there to be used. Change-speed actions were normal though a little care was needed to avoid scrape, second gear could have been quieter. The suspension allows too much movement at the back. . . . This Wolseley Hornet is a smart-looking car."

=== 1935 ===
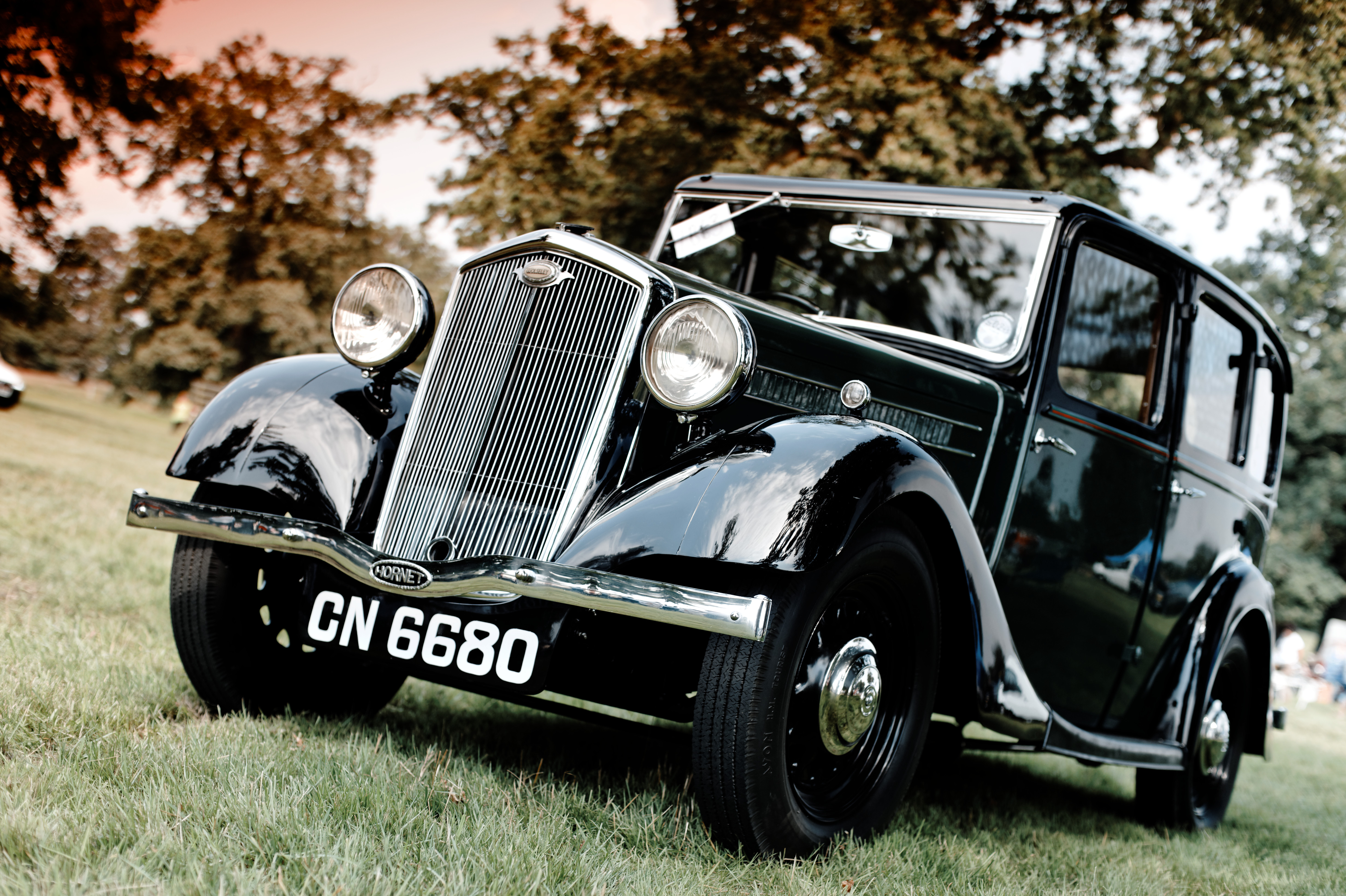
new Hornet saloon May 1935

The car is now more powerful and roomier and its anatomically correct squabs and pneumatic cushions hold four comfortably. At the back the floor has no footwells, the wheels arches are wide, . . . "the car tested might well have had ventilators in the scuttle".

On the road "gear changes are not difficult to make, . . . second might be rather quieter. . . . a little care should be taken to come out of a sharp turn at high speed . . . (possibly) . . . large extra low pressure tyres. . . . the front suspension would perhaps be better without any camber. A passenger behind with only two aboard is apt to feel some fore and aft motion not felt in front. Special easy-clean partly disc wheels are fitted."

== Duke of Gloucester ==
The Times reported the Duke of Gloucester had taken delivery of a 1934 saloon model Wolseley Hornet, earlier examples of which he had had for the past two years. The Duke specially commented on two features, the synchromesh gearbox and the enclosed spare wheel.

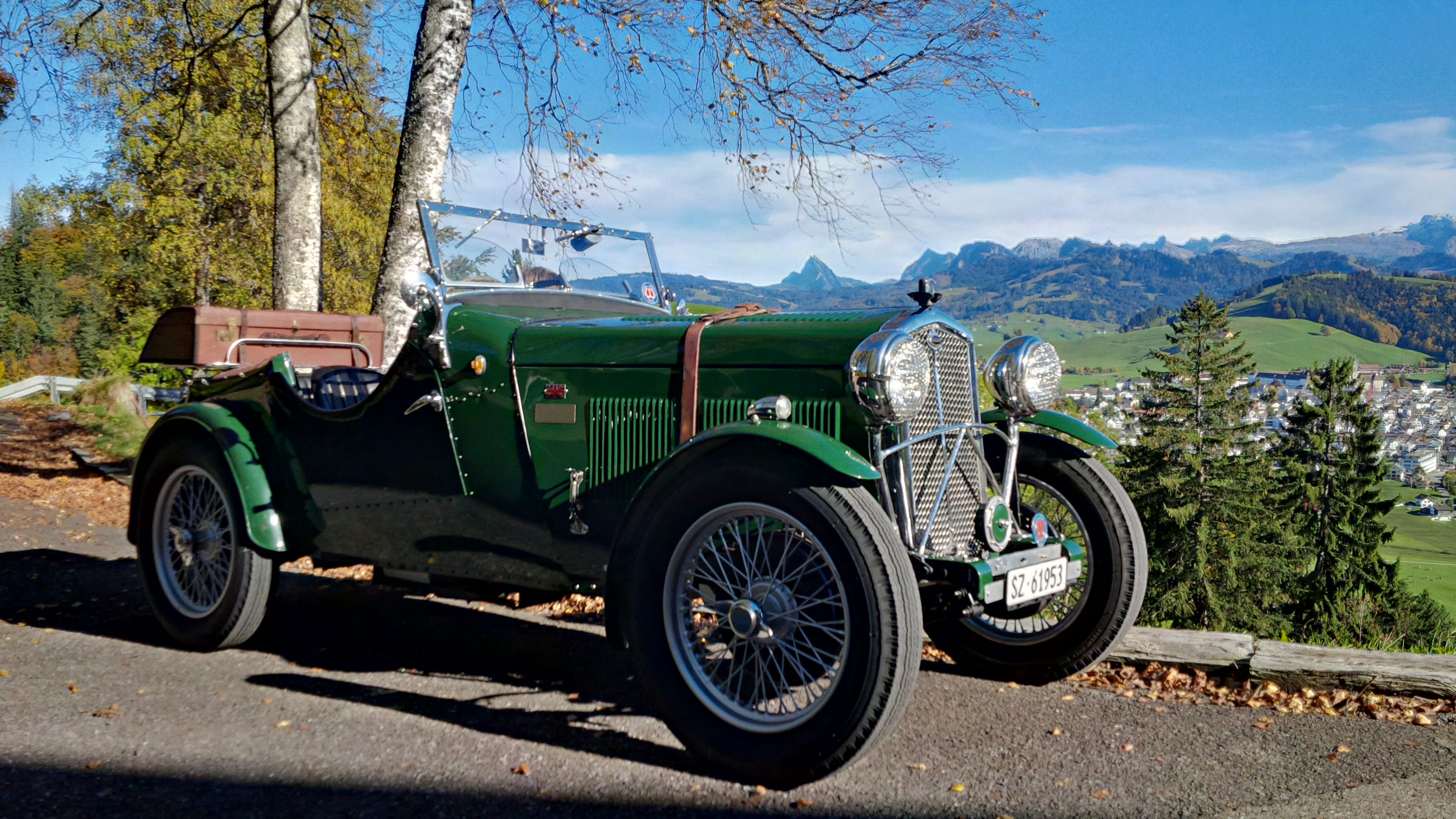

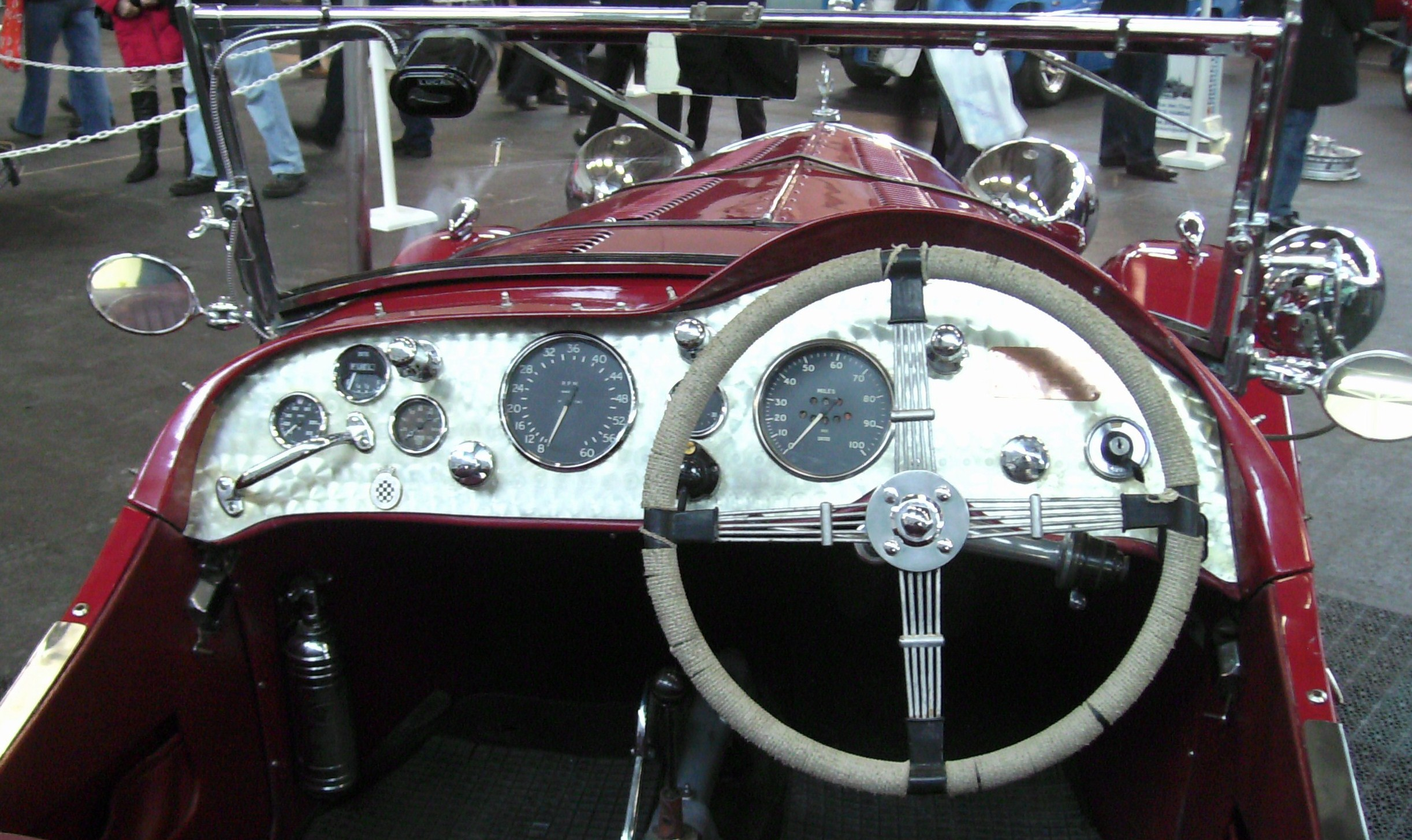

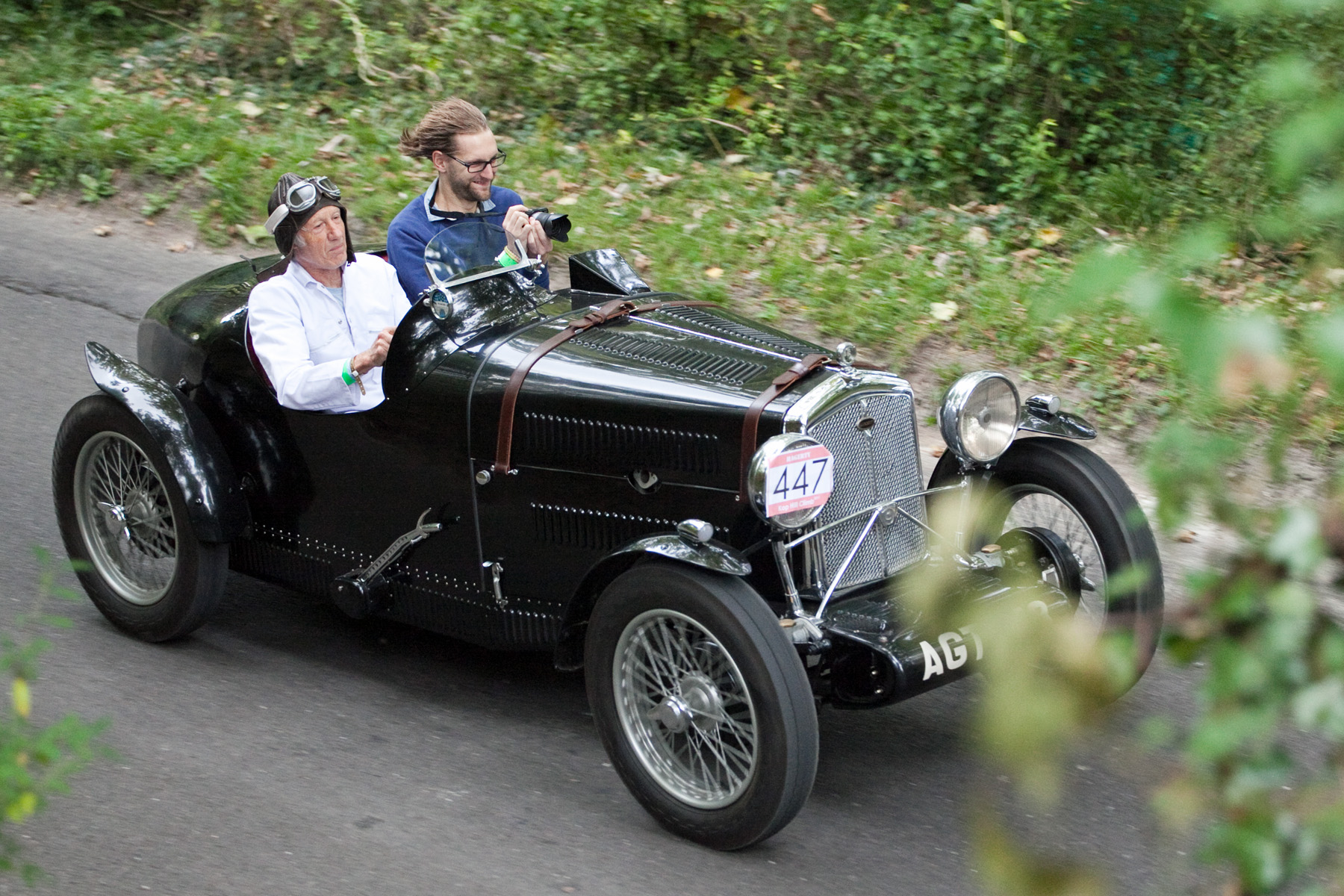

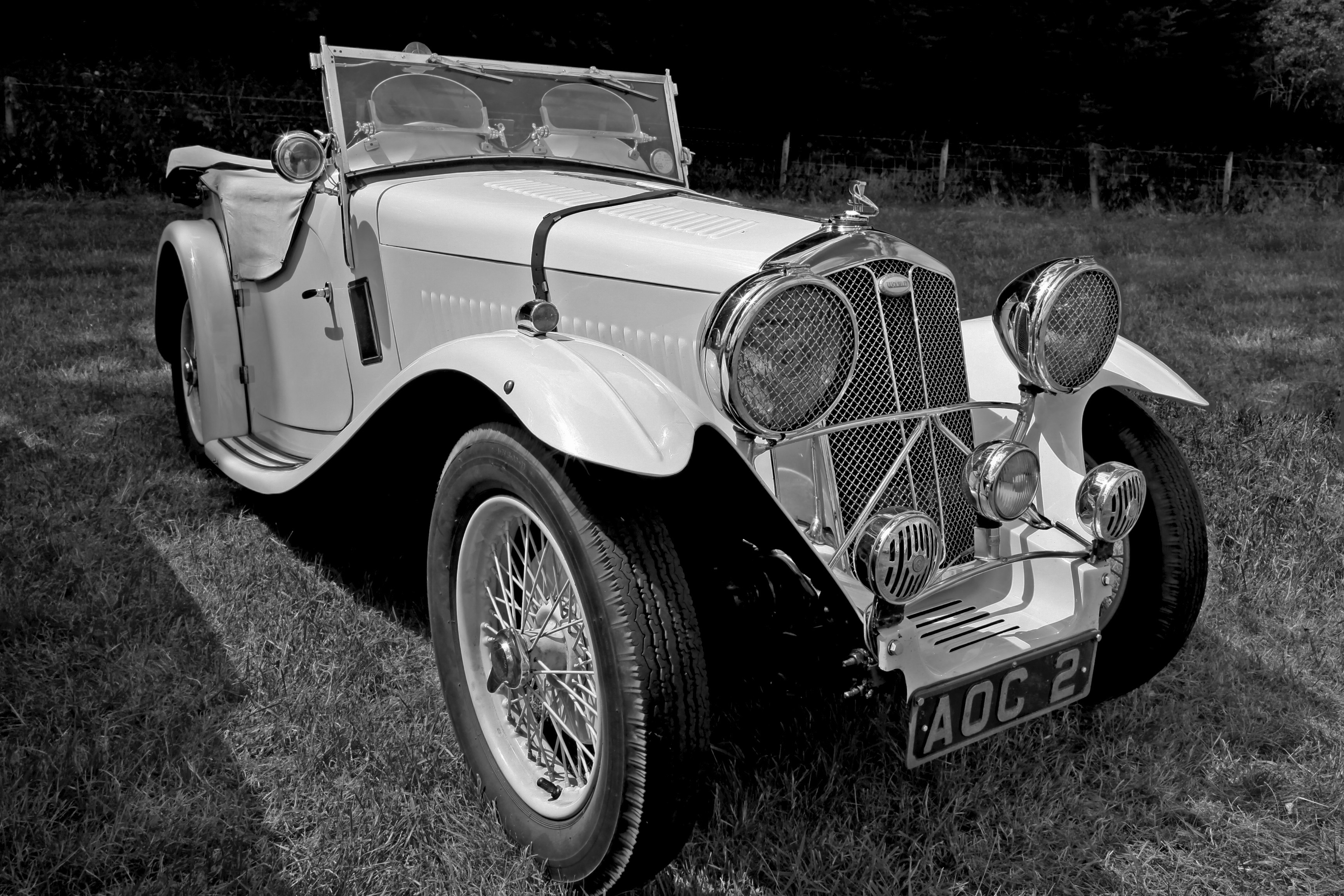

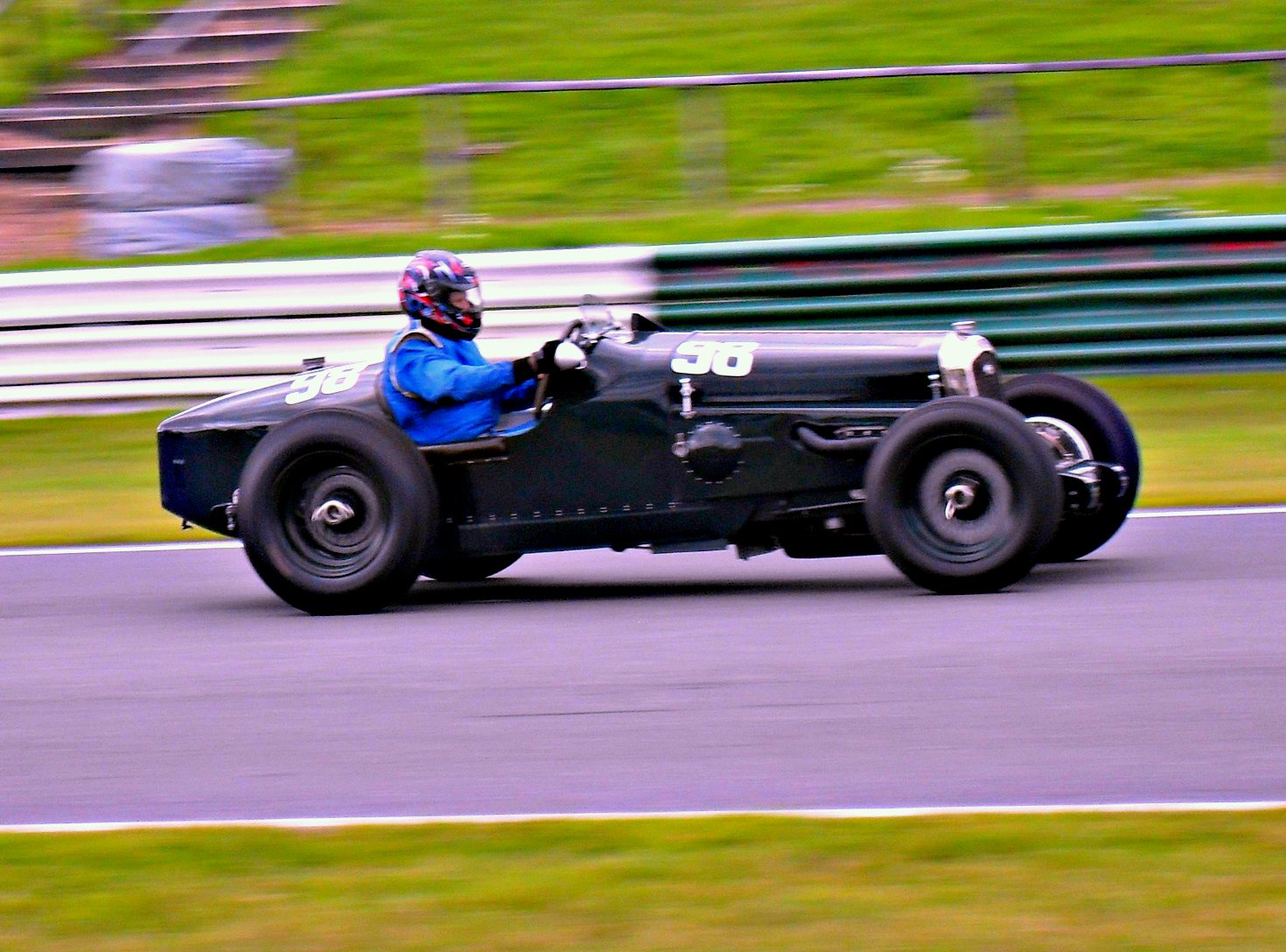

== Hornet Special ==
Two sporting versions were sold only as Hornet Special "rolling" chassis. The first with Hornet's 1271cc engine, the last with a Wolseley Fourteen 1604cc engine. They were sometimes referred to as Special Speed chassis. Saloon and Tickford coupé as well as sporting bodies were fitted. Later cars had a large S mounted on the radiator cap with a small H for hornet in its lower section, the S shaped to be like a striking snake or a preening swan.

=== 1271cc engine ===
The new Special chassis was announced 18 April 1932. It had twin carburettors, higher compression (domed pistons) and numerous smaller modifications including a revised exhaust system (triple-piped manifold —2 inch pipe to the straight-through silencer), duplex valve springs, metal universal joints in the propeller shaft, three inches wider front track and specially large 12-inch brake drums. The long flexible gear-lever was replaced by a remote control and a small short-travel lever. Special front (3 inches wider track at 3" 9") and rear axles were supplied with the saloon's large-hub stud-fixed Magna wire-wheels. Small knock-on hubs in Rudge-Whitworth wheels were optional and usually preferred.

A particularly large speedometer (a quick-reading five inch dial), matching engine revolution counter, and ten inch headlights were supplied as part of the complete kit for the coachbuilder. The large headlights were supported by braced mountings included in the kit.

In the autumn of 1933 to improve its breathing the engine was given a cross-flow head with inlet and exhaust manifolds on opposing sides. The block casting was redesigned to increase its stiffness and the Special received the long wheelbase underslung chassis and other modifications of the saloon including freewheel.

The Special chassis was supplied to various specialist coachbuilders particularly Swallow, Whittingham & Mitchel, Jensen and, now also part of the Morris group, Cunard. 2307 were made.

==== Coachbuilders ====
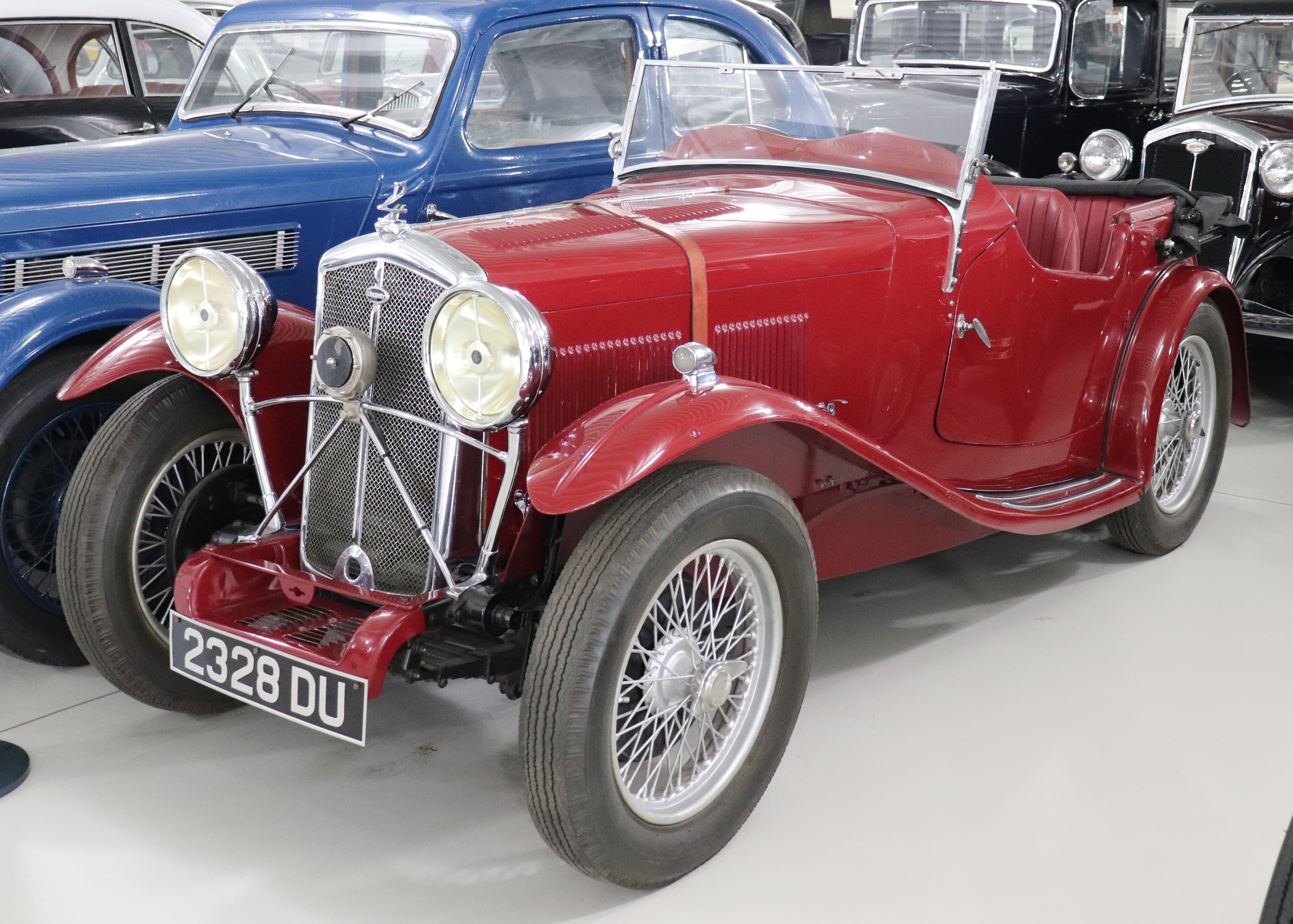
1932 Hornet 'EW Special' displayed in the BMM, Gaydon

Some of the popular bodies were made by:

- Abbey: open 4-seater £275
- Swallow Coachbuilding (S. S.): open 2-seater £255 or 4-seater £260
- Kevill Davies & March: open 2 / 4-seater £289
- Maltby: (Note: Established early in the century by a John Maltby in Sandgate near Folkestone Kent, bought from him by the Redfern brothers in 1927, provided catalogued bodies for a number of manufacturers, specialised in drophead coupés.) open 4-seater £259, fixed head coupé £269
- Patrick: (Note: Patrick Motors Limited, Bristol Road, Bournbrook, Birmingham) open 4-seater £250
- Jensen: fixed head coupé £275
- Eustace Watkins: Daytona open 2 / 4-seater £220, Ariel Tickford fixed head coupé £245
- John Seber: Wolsely Hornet Racer, open 2-seater

=== Swallow ===
Bodies on the Wolseley Hornet chassis fitted in well with Swallow's product range. They were the first 6-cylinder Swallows, production began in January 1931 with an open 2-seater. A 4-seater car followed in that autumn. In April 1932 the new Special chassis arrived and these cars were quite popular. They were the last of the special-bodied Swallows, replaced in the summer of 1933 by their SS1 tourer first announced in March 1933.

Production:

- Special Hornets: 2-seaters — 21; 4-seaters — 185
- standard Hornets: 2-seaters — 100+; 4-seaters — 224 (the quantity of 2-seaters made in the first part of 1931 is unknown)

Advertising slogan for the Wolseley Hornet-Swallow cars: "The Swallow touch that means so much".

=== Eustace Watkins ===
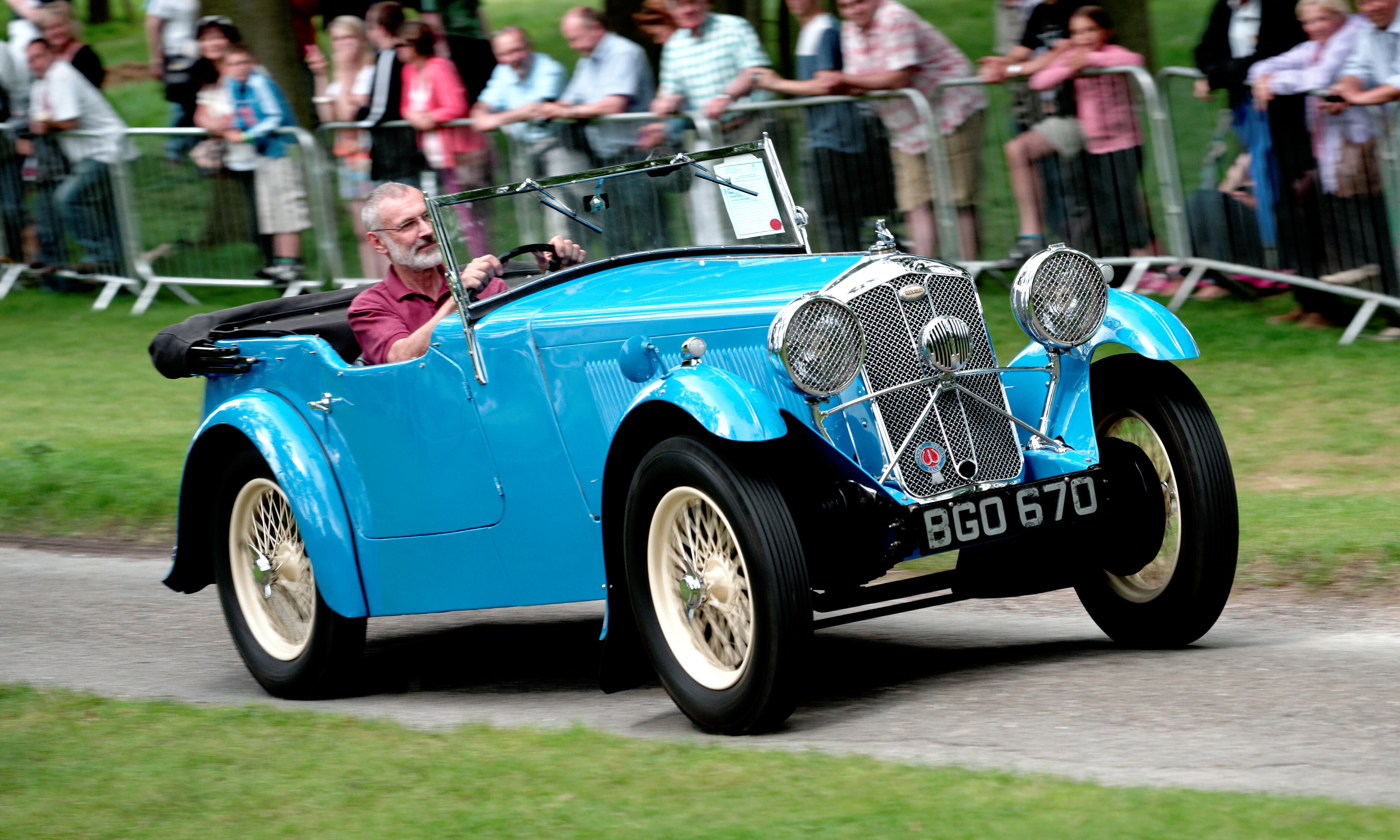
A late 1934 car, 1604cc centre-lock wire wheels

London and suburbs sole Wolseley distributor, Eustace Watkins Limited, designed and sourced their own E W Specials probably from Abbey. Eustace Watkins provided the 2 / 4 seater Daytona and the Silex fixed-head coupé.

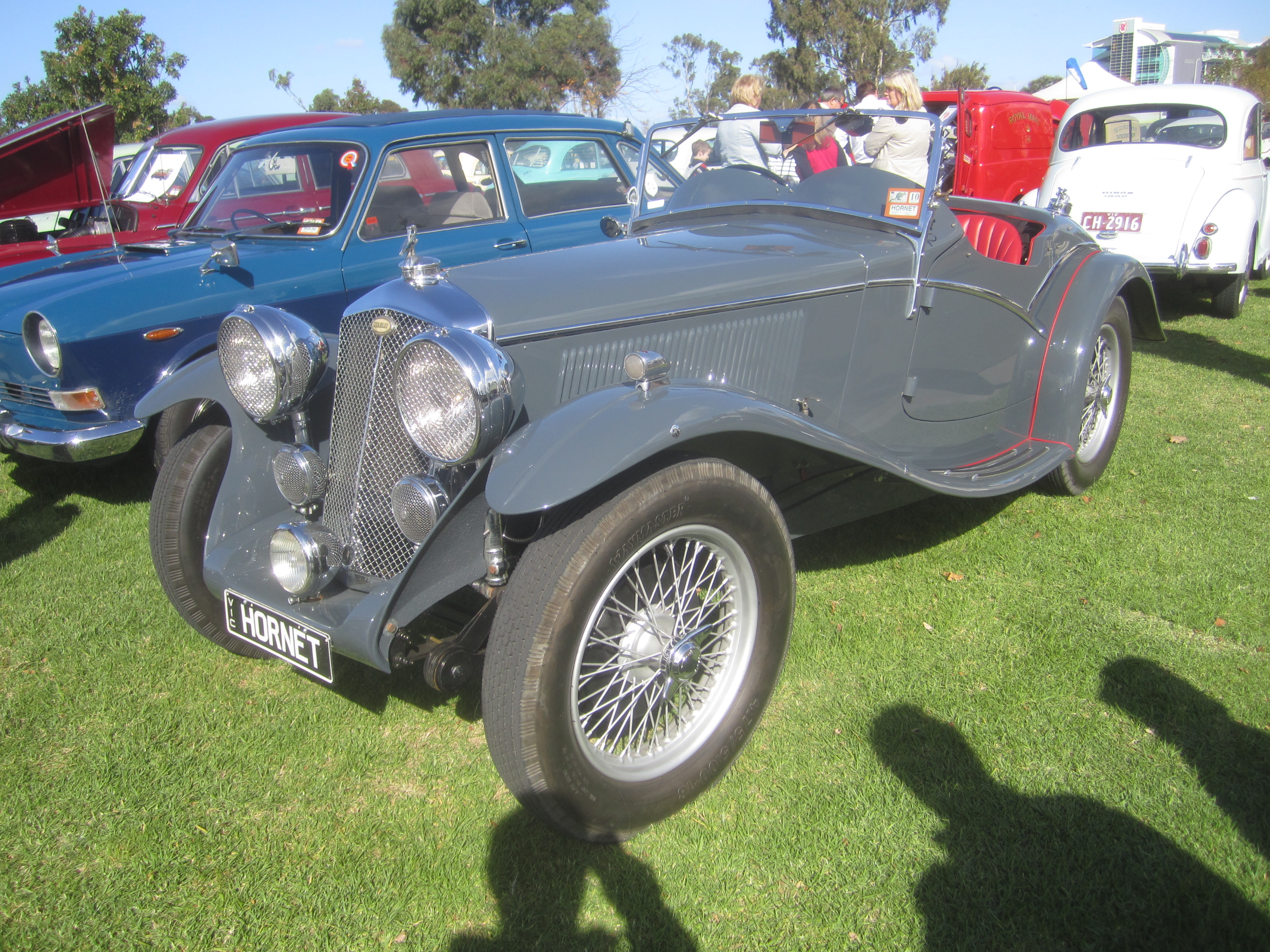
Special open 2-seater in Australia

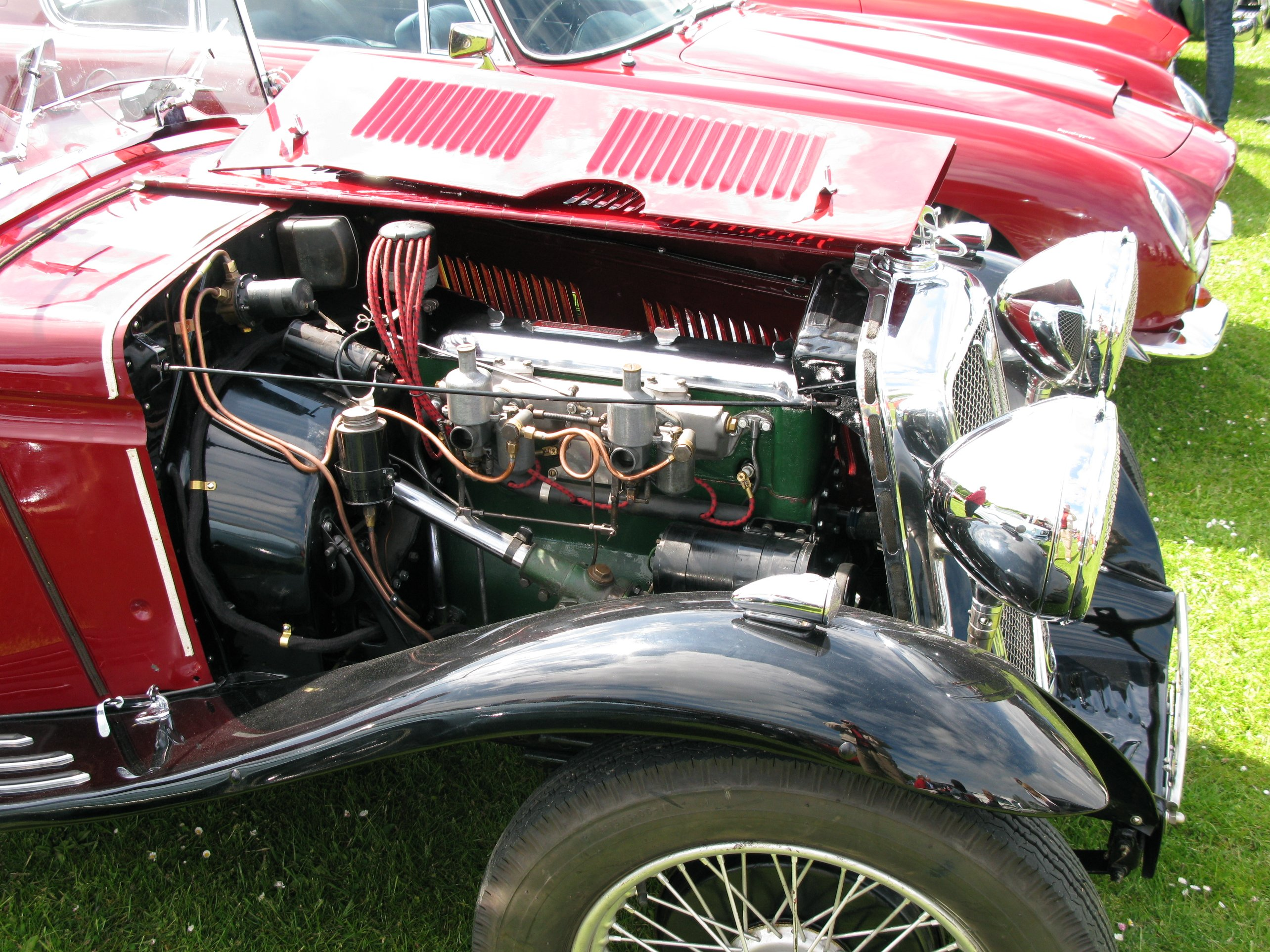
engine of a Special

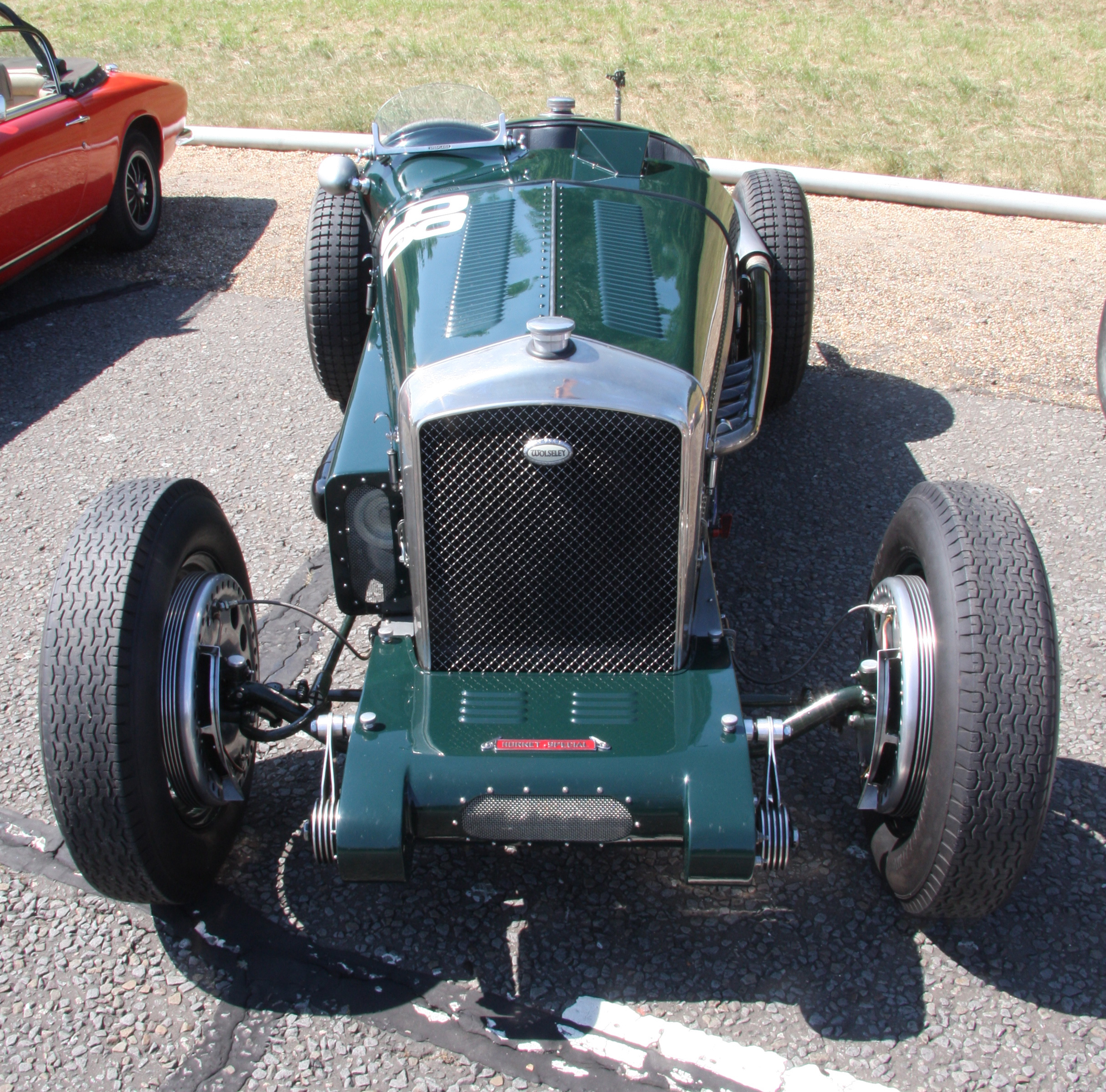
John Seber special, supercharged

=== 1604cc engine ===
For 1935 the Special was given the 1604 cc engine from the Wolseley Fourteen on the underslung 95in chassis but only 148 of these chassis were made.

=== Daytona Hornet Special road test by Sir Malcolm Campbell ===
Published Saturday 2 July 1932. Sir Malcolm, holder of the World's Land Speed Record, reported that the Daytona, one of the latest Hornet Specials was fitted with a sporting two / four seater body. The car's 1271cc engine was fitted with twin S.U. carburetters and he wrote it was pleasing to see particular attention had been paid to cooling and cleaning the engine oil. The motor was designed to turn at speeds up to 5,000 rpm which could be very quickly achieved in third gear. The maximum speed in top was in the region of 75 mph. Extra large 12-inch brake drums were fitted. Either Rudge Whitworth or Magna wheels were supplied. The front seats were reported to be comfortable with ample leg room for the tallest driver though the back seat could not be recommended for two people on a long run it was ideal for luggage protected from rain by a tonneau cover. Mudguards were of the cycle type and added to the appearance of the car.

"The engine is very near perfection . . . lively, vibrationless and exceedingly quiet, does its work without fuss or bother, quickly reaches 5,000 rpm and a road speed in third gear over 60 mph." "Steering is light, brakes are powerful and work smoothly and the suspension is good . . . when the gears are judiciously used the acceleration is really amazing."

However, Sir Malcolm regarded the clutch and brake pedals to be much too small and smoothly surfaced. He also regretted there was no external adjustment to the hydraulic shock absorbers which he considered necessary when dealing with such a light and fast little car.

Sir Malcolm summed up with: "This car is really a most attractive proposition. Its acceleration is so good that it would take a really powerful and well-tuned car to keep on its heels, and its upkeep is low."
