= Abbey (coachbuilder) =

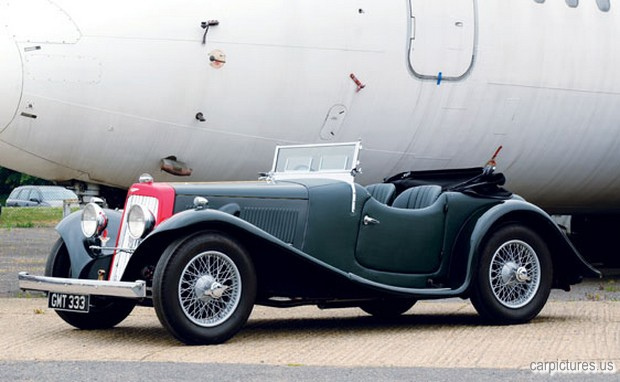
1938 sports tourer on a 15-98 Aston Martin chassis

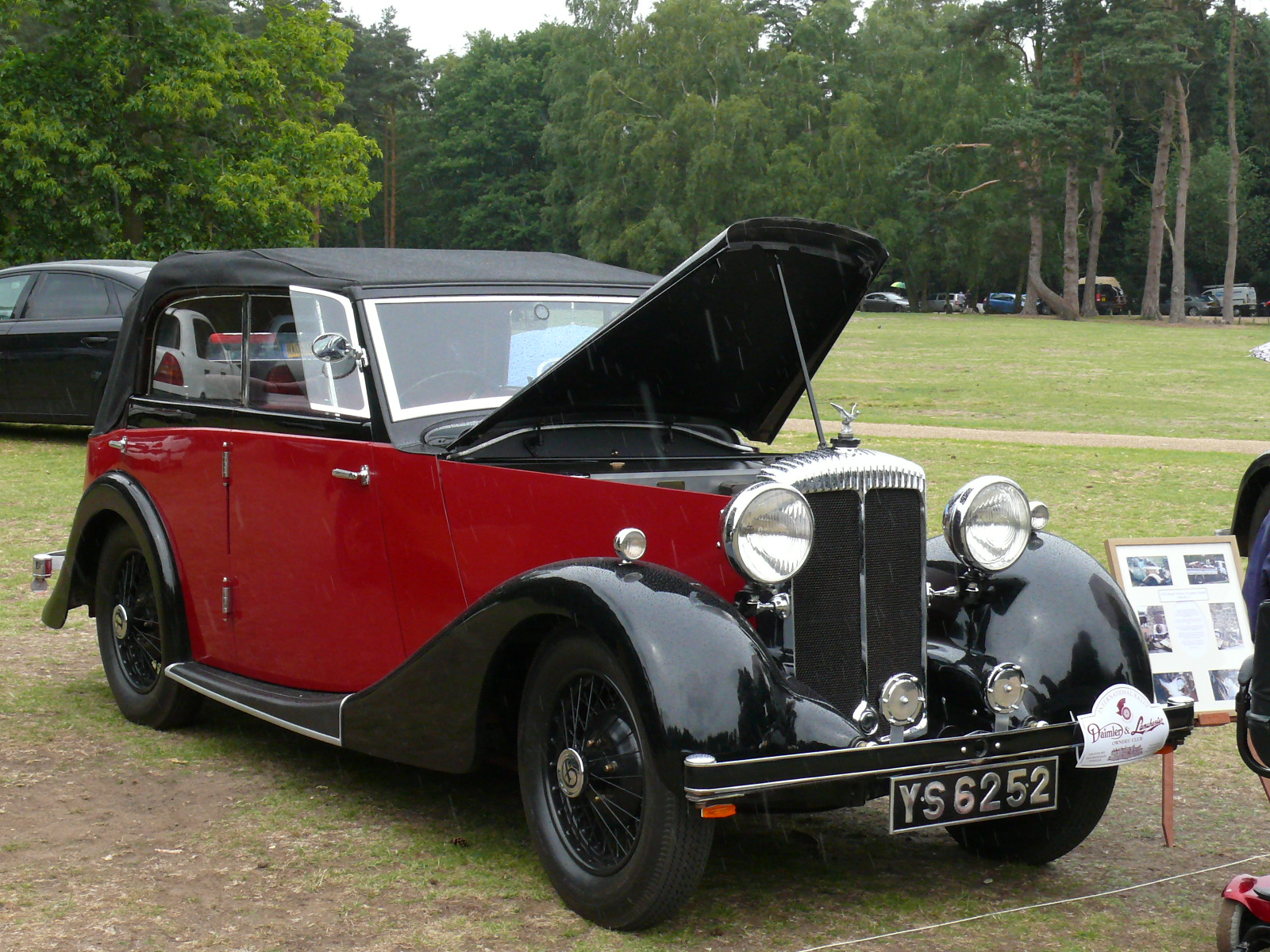
1936 Martin Walter Wingham 4-dr all-weather body on a Daimler Fifteen chassis —Sandringham

Abbey Coachworks Limited was a British coachbuilding business based in Merton, South West London and later Acton, North West London. It was active between 1930 and 1938.

Arthur P Compton set up several coachbuilding businesses, including Compton, Sons and Terry which was founded in 1929 in Merton, South West London. He left this in 1930 to set up on his own, and the other partner D.H. Terry with D.H.B. Power renamed the company Abbey Coachworks. In 1933, the company moved to larger premises in Acton, North West London. In 1936, they took over the Wingham brand from Martin Walter and changed their name to Wingham Martin Walter. They exhibited at the 1937 London Motor Show under the new name. By the late 1930s, the practice of custom coachbuilding on a car maker's chassis was in decline leading to the business' eventual collapse by the end of the decade.

Abbey seem to have concentrated on short production runs rather than bespoke bodywork. Cars they equipped included the Wolseley Hornet Special, Rover 20 and various MGs particularly their MG Magna, Fords, Hillmans and Vauxhalls. Some of their production was for other coachbuilders such as Jarvis of Wimbledon and was sold under names other than Abbey. Around 1937 they also produced bodywork for the French automobile manufacturer Delahaye. The car pictured on that page with numberplate DXE-66 has undergone a thorough restoration in France during the years 2018 - 2019 and now resides in Belgium.

Martin Walter themselves remained in business after the demise of Abbey, and after the Second World War made a range of motor caravans under the Dormobile name, and ambulance and minibus bodies on Bedford Austin and Ford chassis.
