= Jarvis of Wimbledon =

British motor dealers

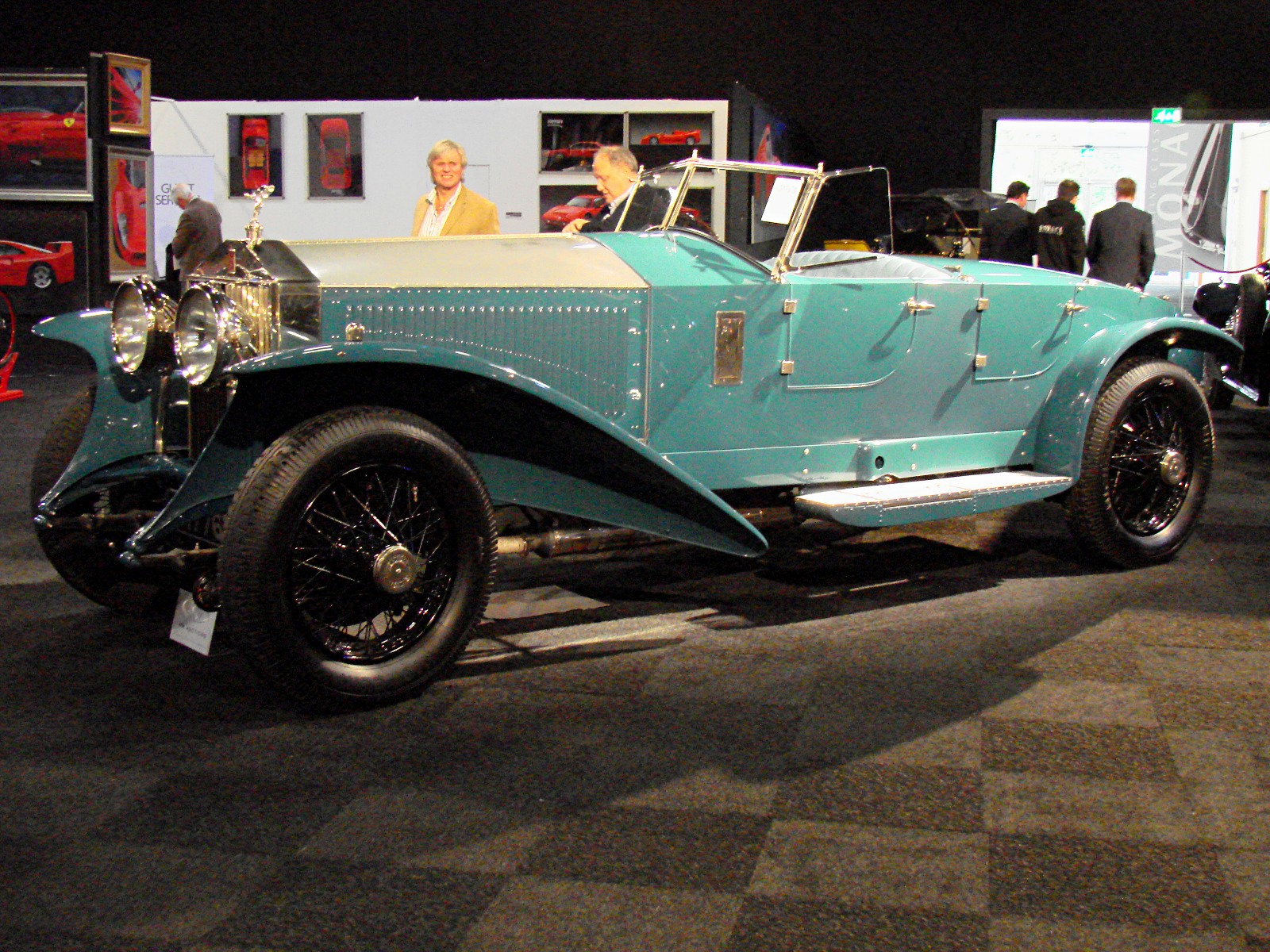
Rolls-Royce Phantom I with torpedo style bodywork by Jarvis

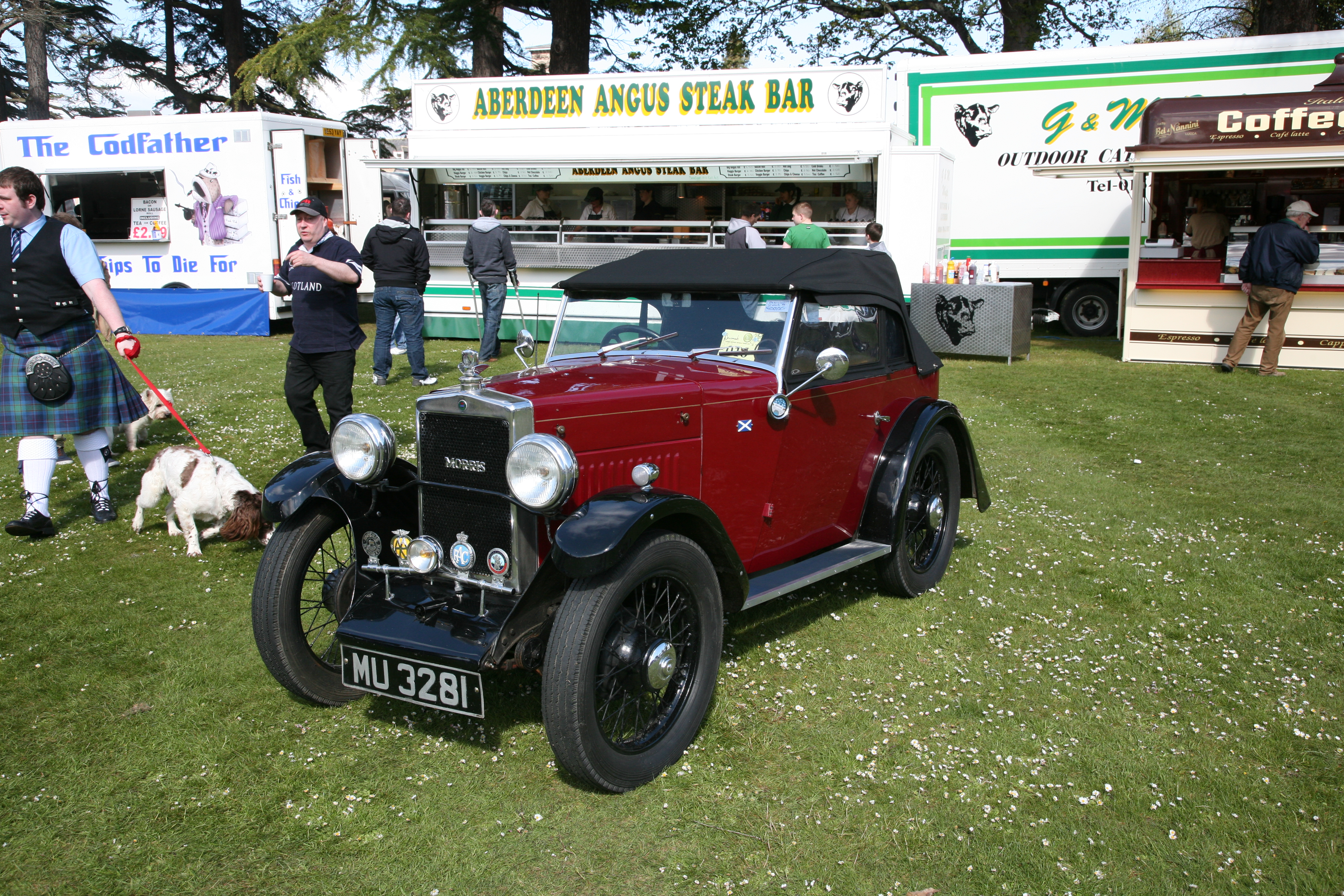
1931 Morris Minor Flat Nose with 2 seat Jarvis touring body

Jarvis & Sons Limited were South London-based motor dealers for Morris and MG, and latterly coachworks providing special bodies for various car chassis until after World War II.

== Operations ==
Like many similar UK motor dealers and coachworks, they started out in the late 19th century as bicycle manufacturers, later incorporated as Jarvis & Sons Limited.

From the 1920s, they founded coachworks, operating from premises in both Victoria Crescent and Hartfield Road in Wimbledon, and a motor dealership known as Jarvis of Wimbledon based at Morris House in Morden Road SW 19, on the borders between Wimbledon and Morden which was then located in Surrey.

Coachbuilding operations utilised a variety of chassis, including Rolls-Royce and the then Cricklewood-based Bentley Motors, and at least one Bugatti Type 30. and a type 40 (chassis # 40470). However, due to the resultant volume of orders many of the projects were subcontracted to other coachworks, in particular Abbey Coachworks of Merton.

Post-WW2, having acted as a shadow factory during hostilities, the company continued as a car dealership. Today the 1937 art-deco inspired building with clock tower has been demolished, and the former site has been redeveloped and is presently used by a Peugeot cars dealership.

== Jappic ==
Designed and driven by H.M. Walters who was a director of Jarvis of Wimbledon, he was also a works rider for Zenith and Panther, the Jappic was advertised as the "world's smallest racecar". Built by Jarvis, the two-seater cyclecar used an air-cooled two-port overhead-valve 74x80mm single-cylinder 344cc JA Prestwich "JAP" motorcycle engine, sat in an ash wood frame covered with 3/32 inch steel flitch plates and tubular cross-members. A three-speed gearbox used a chain-drive to the rear axle, with only the rear live axle equipped with brakes, with all four wheels using 650x65 motorcycle tyres. Weighing in at only 4 long hundredweight (450 lb; 200 kg) and costing just £150 to buy, the car was aimed at competing in the holiday-handicap races. After Walters broke the Class J flying mile record in the car at a speed of 70.33 miles per hour (113.19 km/h), it was subsequently advertised being able to lap Brooklands at over 68 miles per hour (109 km/h).

Jarvis had planned to commercially produce the small racing car, but as the venture never took off commercially, they tried to re-market the vehicle again in 1926 with a larger 495cc JAP engine. But again the venture failed, and so in late 1926 they sold the sole prototype vehicle to noted WW1 ambulance driver and then racing driver Mrs Gwenda Stewart. Under copyright agreement with JAP/Walters/Jarvis, she had to change the name to Hawkes-Stewart, and then retro-fitted the vehicle with an original 344cc engine. The car went on to break 50kms and 100kms records at an average speed of nearly 70 mph, and was destroyed by a fire at the Autodrome de Linas-Montlhéry in 1932.

== Racing cars ==
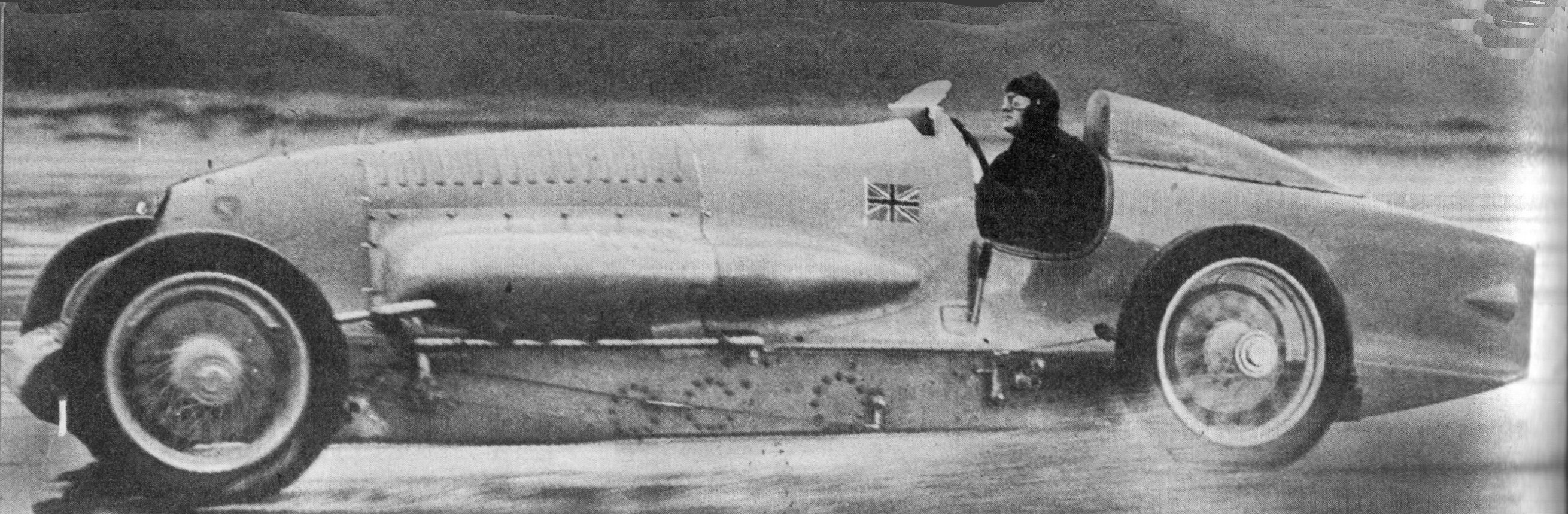
Sir Malcolm Campbell at the wheel of the original bodied Napier-Campbell Blue Bird at Pendine Sands, Wales in January 1927

Jarvis built a reputation for building several successful, aerodynamic design concept bodies, for several well-known 1920s racing drivers.

At the start of the 1924 season Woolf Barnato swapped his racing Wolseley Racing Moth for an eight-litre Hispano-Suiza H6C, which he commissioned Jarvis to build a suitable racing body for. Barnato then established an eight-litre class racing record for the car. In late 1924 he obtained a prototype Bentley 3 Litre chassis, which was subsequently fitted with a boat-tail body by Jarvis for a cost of £400. Partnered in 1925 by John Duff, Barnato used the car to win several major Brooklands races, and set a new 3 Litre 24-hour record averaging 95.03 miles per hour (152.94 km/h) in 1925. Barnato continued to race the Jarvis-bodied Bentley into 1926, in which he obtained a first and a second at the Easter 1926 BARC races, but then unexpectedly sold it to J. G. Parry-Thomas, who intended to modify it and use it to compete in 1927. However, having modified his land speed record car Babs over the winter, Parry-Thomas was killed in Babs at Pendine Sands, Wales on 3 March 1927. His estate sold the car, and it then next competed in the 1928 season equipped with a Parry Thomas frontal cowling, driven by Dudley Froy.

The noted racing driver and later World land speed record holder Sir Malcolm Campbell had both his own garage at the Brooklands racing circuit, as well as a motor dealership, Bluebird Garage on Chelsea's fashionable King's Road. After he took on the new franchise of selling American-built Chrysler Corporation vehicles from 1925, he commissioned his regular racing mechanic Leo Villa to take a Chrysler Model 70 chassis (actually a re-badged Maxwell automobile design), and build him a new racing car under the guises of a marketing exercise. Villa reworked the chassis and engine, and then commissioned Jarvis to build a suitable aerodynamic body. Driven by Campbell, the original Chrysler Bluebird won the Short Handicap at Brooklands on 12 September 1925, at an average speed of 99.61 miles per hour (160.31 km/h).

In the same year, having realised that his Sunbeam car would then quickly restrict his world record speed attempts above 150 miles per hour (240 km/h), Campbell commissioned C. Amherst Villiers at the Robin Hood Engineering Works in Putney Vale to build the first of his Bluebird record-breaking cars. Taking two years to construct under the supervision of Villa, the Napier-Campbell Blue Bird was designed by Villiers to reach 200 miles per hour (320 km/h). The 1927 original version contained a Napier Lion aero-engine within a custom-design chassis, encased in an aerodynamic body co-designed and then built by Jarvis. In its later second and third guises, Villers improved the aerodynamic efficiency of the Jarvis bodywork within a wind tunnel.

In the 1930s, Jarvis was the main sponsor of the EX-type Magic Midget's record-breaking cars.
