= Standard Flying Nine =

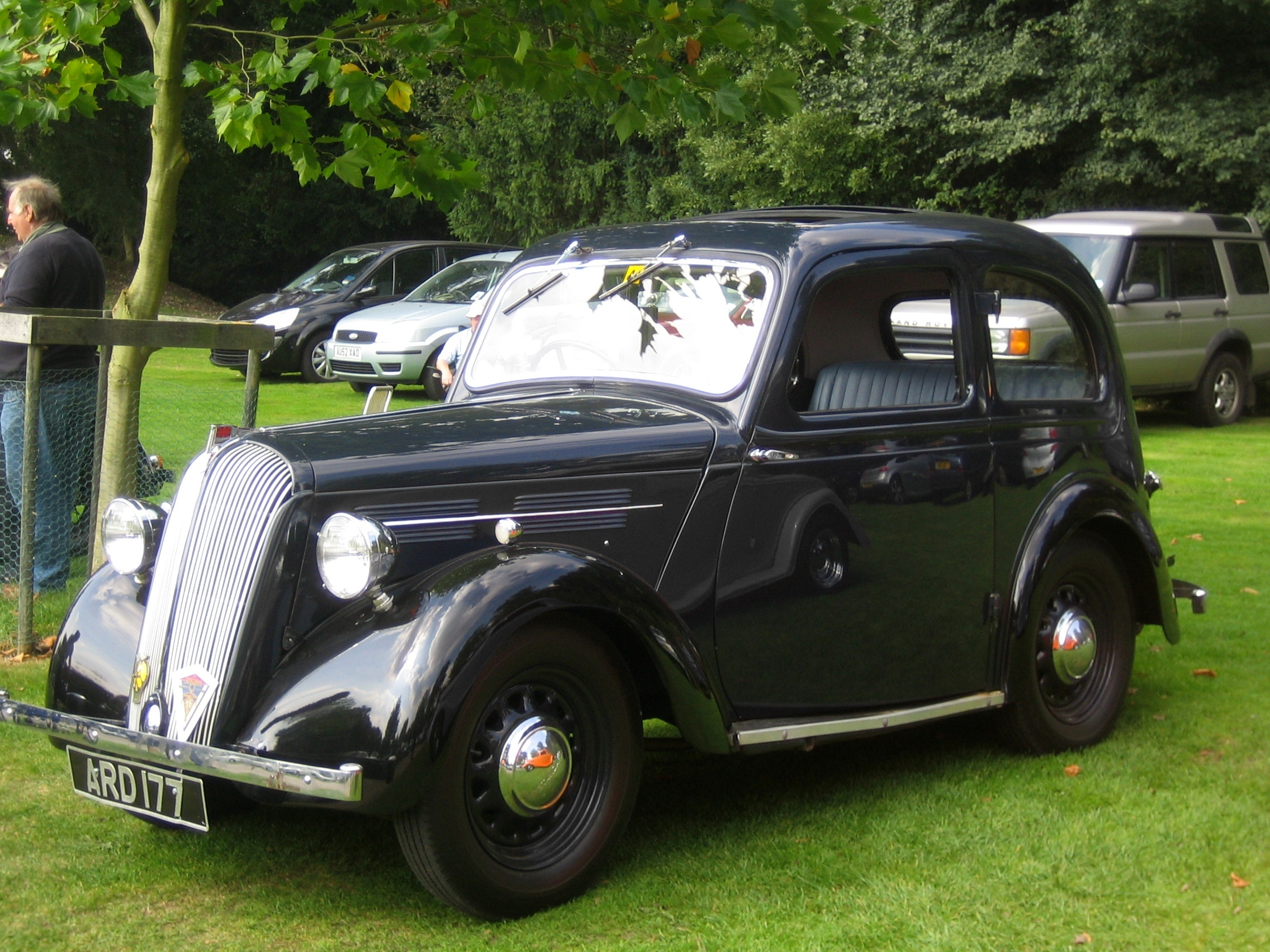
- 1938 Standard Flying Nine DeLuxe

Overview
- Manufacturer: Standard Motor Company
- Production: 1936-1940

Body and chassis
- Body style: 2-door saloon

Powertrain
- Engine: 1,131 cc Nine sv I4
- Transmission: Four speed manual with synchromesh

Dimensions
- Wheelbase: 85 in (2,159 mm)
- Length: 139 in (3,531 mm)
- Width: 56 in (1,422 mm)
- Curb weight: 1,900 lb (864 kg)

Chronology
- Predecessor: Standard Little Nine
- Successor: Standard Eight

The Flying Nine was a small family car produced by the British Standard Motor Company between July 1936 and 1940. It was the smallest of several relatively streamlined cars with which the company, in common with several UK mass market competitors, broadened and updated its range in the later 1930s. The Flying Standard series began with the Flying Twelve, Sixteen, and Twenty in October 1935, with smaller versions ranging down to 8HP added in the following years.

== Design ==
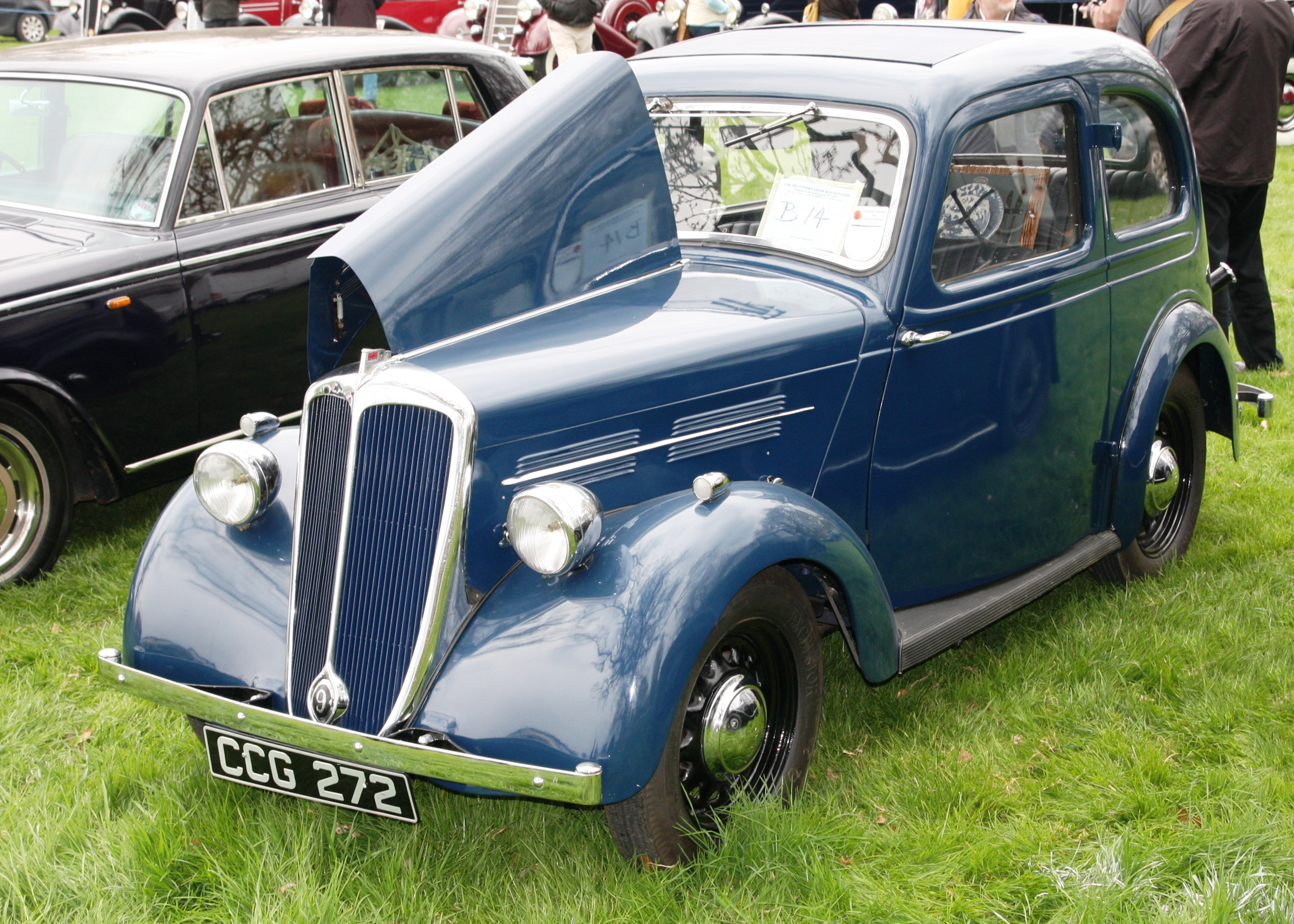
1937 Standard Flying Nine DeLuxe

Behind the stylish rearward sloping radiator grille was a 1,131 cc side-valve engine, with a relatively long 100 mm (3.9 in) stroke and a 60 mm (2.4 in) bore. The long stroke maximised the engine capacity available in the 9 HP tax class which, in the UK at that time, categorised cars and set annual car tax according to the diameter (bore) of the engine's cylinders. Maximum output was 30 bhp (22 kW) at the time of introduction. The side-valve engine received an aluminium head, a single Zenith carburettor, and thermo-siphon cooling. Power was delivered to the rear wheels via a four-speed gearbox with synchronization on the top three gears. By 1939, maximum power output had climbed to 33 bhp (25 kW) at 4,000 rpm.

The two-door, four-light body was all-steel and featured a standard sliding sunroof. The Flying Nine was somewhat of a departure from the existing Flying Standard range; being only available as a two-door, lacking outside access to the luggage compartment, having an externally mounted spare wheel, and featuring running boards. The 1939 Nine Super (9CB) finally received a rear bootlid and a slight notchback style, while the short 1940 model year's production benefitted from independent front suspension. Earlier models had rigid, H-section front axles suspended by longitudinally-mounted leaf springs.

=== Models ===
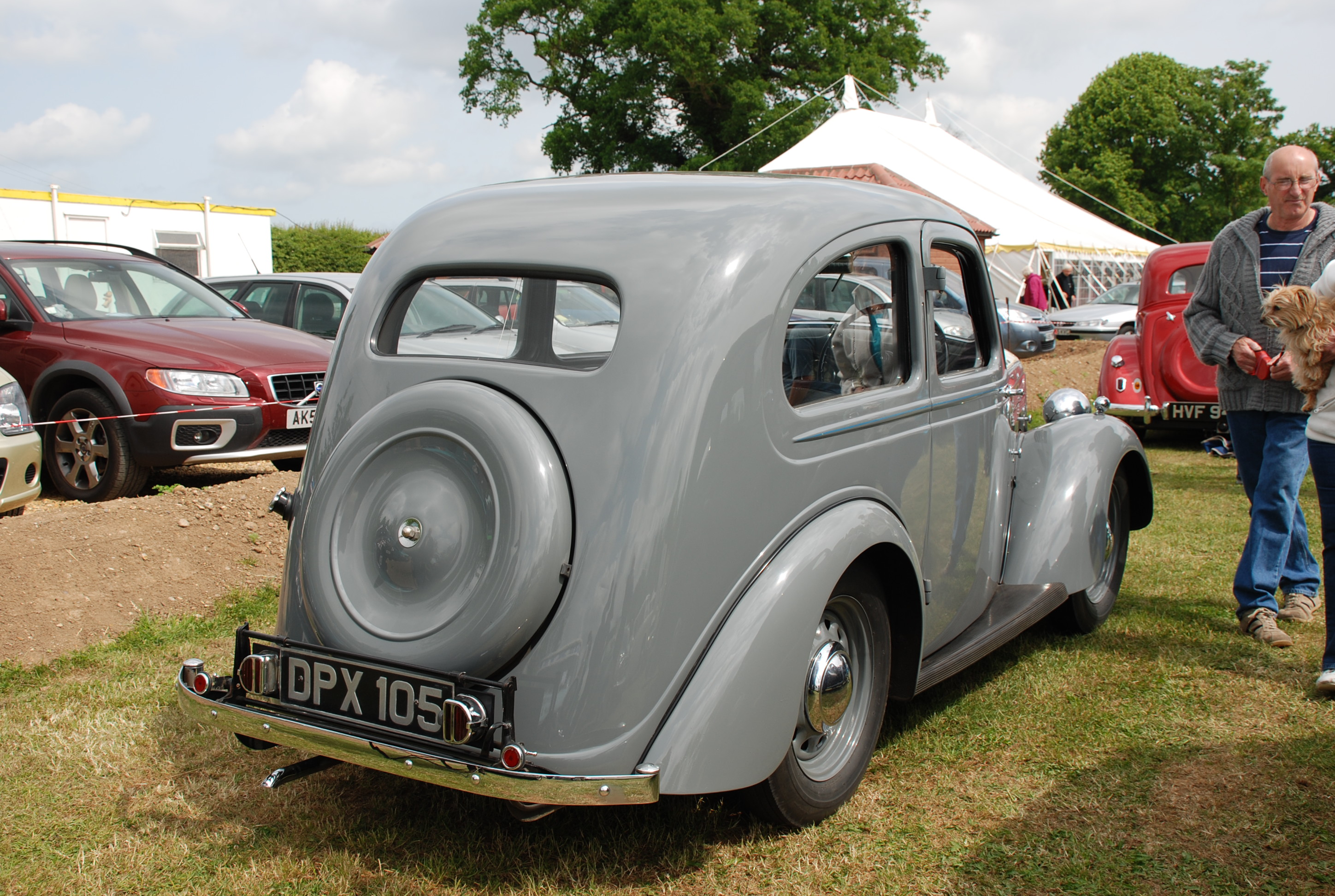
Rear view of a 1938 Standard Flying Nine DeLuxe, showing the spare wheel cover and absence of a bootlid.

Standard offered a basic model and a DeLuxe model, with various additional equipment such as a dome light, wind down rear side windows, and a body-coloured cover for the spare wheel. While the DeLuxe received leather upholstery, the base Saloon had to make do with something called "leather cloth". A minor facelift in time for the 1937 London Motor Show (and the 1938 model year) involved a change to the radiator grille which, while still rearward leaning, now became more curvilinear in what was called the Waterfall style. The new model numbers were 9B and 9BA. The 1939 model year started out as before, but then the Super Saloon was added to the lineup. As well equipped as the DeLuxe, it received revised bodywork at the rear and now had an external bootlid. The base model and the DeLuxe remained on sale alongside the Super for a while, but then a base version of the updated design, called the Popular Saloon, replaced the base and DeLuxe at some time during the model year. As with the DeLuxe, the Popular also forewent a clock, dome light, and sun visor, and was fitted with black plated headlights rather than the Super Saloon's chromed units.

Production came to an end in 1940, in response to the requirement to switch the UK car factories over to producing war supplies. By this time the car had been joined in the company's line-up by the similarly bodied but smaller engined and considerably faster selling Standard Eight. After the war, with Britain much impoverished, only the Standard Eight was revived.
