= Swallow Sidecar Company =

British sidecar manufacturers became Jaguar Cars

Walmsley & Lyons
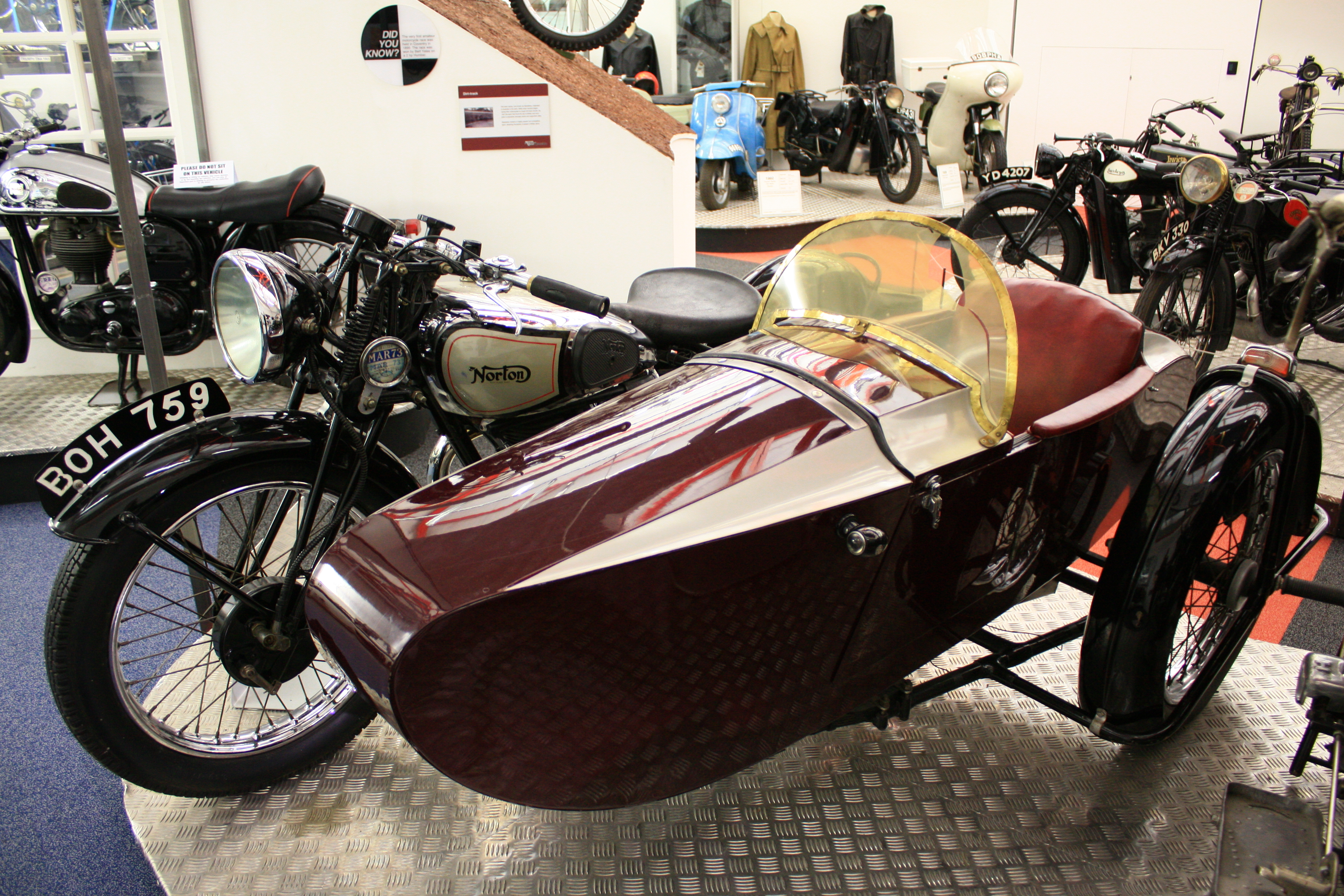
- 1935 Sidecar and a Norton Model 18 in the Coventry Transport Museum
- Trade name: Swallow Sidecar Company (1922–1926); Swallow Sidecar and Coachbuilding Company (1926–1927); Swallow Coachbuilding Company (1927–1930)
- Industry: Motor vehicle bodies
- Founded: 2 September 1922 in Blackpool, England
- Founders: William Walmsley and William Lyons
- Defunct: 30 September 1930
- Fate: Walmsley & Lyons sold to Swallow Coachbuilding Company Limited
- Successor: Swallow Coachbuilding Company Limited
- Headquarters: Blackpool, then Coventry, England
- Products: Sidecars and car bodies
- Brands: Swallow
- Owners: William Walmsley and William Lyons

Swallow Sidecar Company, (Note: The first of three trading names used by W. Walmsley and W. Lyons for their manufacturing business. They were in partnerships: Swallow Sidecar Company, 1922–1926; Swallow Sidecar and Coachbuilding Company, 1926–1927; Swallow Coachbuilding Company, 1927–1930; Then shareholders together in the limited liability company with the name: Swallow Coachbuilding Company Limited operating with effect from October 1930, liquidated in 1934 after the purchase of its business by SS Cars Limited.) Swallow Sidecar and Coachbuilding Company, and Swallow Coachbuilding Company were trading names used by Walmsley & Lyons, partners and joint owners of a British manufacturer of motorcycle sidecars and automobile bodies in Blackpool, Lancashire (later Coventry, Warwickshire), before incorporating a company in 1930 to own their business, which they named Swallow Coachbuilding Company Limited.

Under co-founder William Lyons, its business continued to prosper as S.S. Cars Limited and grew into Jaguar Cars Limited. The sidecar manufacturing business, by then owned by a different company, Swallow Coachbuilding Company (1935) Limited, was sold by Jaguar in January 1946 to an aircraft maintenance firm, Helliwell Group.

== Lyons and Walmsley ==
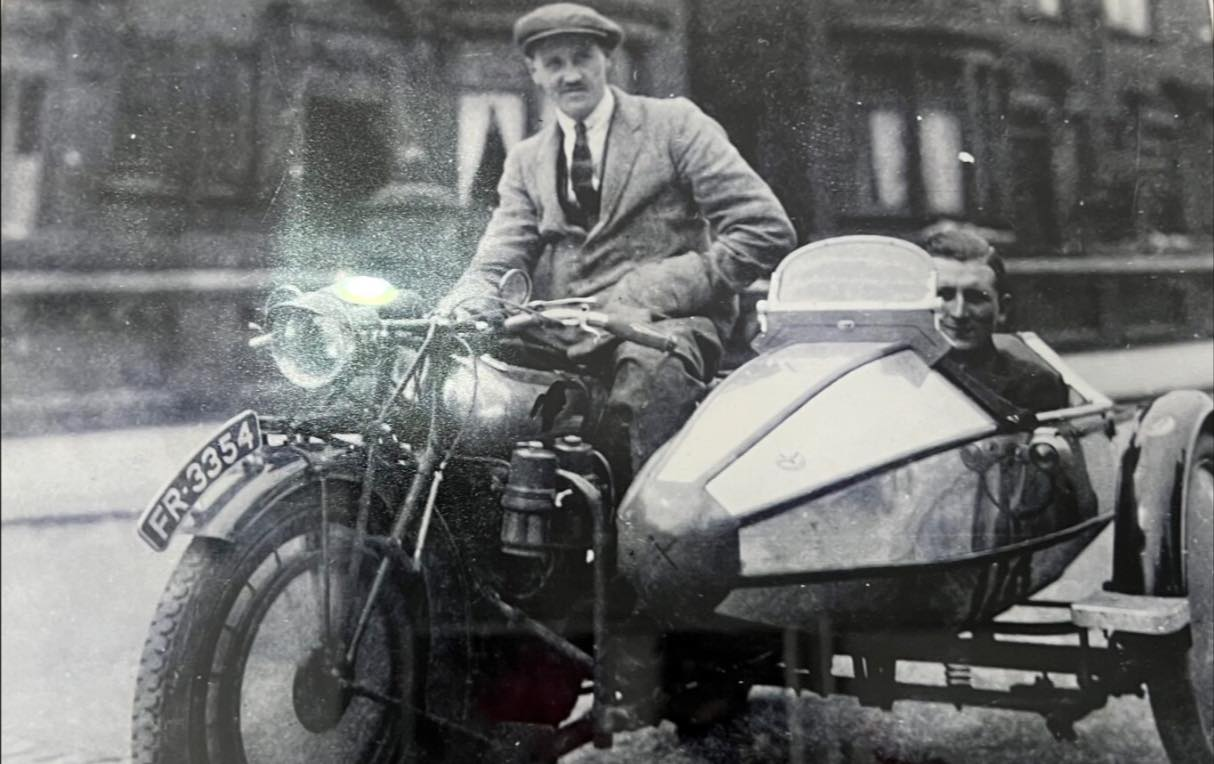
Walmsley and Williams (sitting) with the Model no. 1 Swallow sidecar on King Edward avenue in Blackpool, where they grew up and engineering facilities were initially. The motorcycle is a Brough Superior SS80.

The business was founded by two friends, William Walmsley (aged 30) and William Lyons (aged 20). (Note: At that time, as a minor until he was 21 (later 18), Lyons was unable to enter a proper binding business contract without specific court approval under a law for the protection of young people.) Their partnership became official on Lyons's 21st birthday, 4 September 1922. Both families lived on the same street, King Edward Avenue in Blackpool, England. Walmsley had previously been making sidecars and bolting them onto reconditioned motorcycles. Lyons had served his apprenticeship at Crossley Motors in Manchester before moving to a Blackpool Sunbeam dealer, Brown & Mallalieu, as a junior salesman.

Their business partnership was known by three successive trading names: Swallow Sidecar Company, Swallow Sidecar and Coachbuilding Company, and Swallow Coachbuilding Company. In 1930, a limited liability company was incorporated to own their business.

== Sidecars ==
=== Swallow Sidecar ===
Lyons, having recognised the commercial potential for these sidecars, joined Walmsley and together they found premises in Bloomfield Road, Blackpool using a £1,000 bank overdraft obtained with the assistance of their fathers. With a small team of employees they were able to begin commercial production of motorcycle sidecars. Soon they had to rent more space nearby. Then they needed still more room. Walmsley's father bought a big building in Cocker Street Blackpool which they moved into and with all the extra space began to offer to repair and paint cars and fit new hoods and upholstery. They added coach building to their business name.

== Automobile bodies ==
=== Swallow Sidecar and Coachbuilding ===
The first car that Lyons and Walmsley worked on intending to build and sell it in any quantity was the Austin 7, a popular and inexpensive vehicle. For their show car Swallow's Bolton, Lancashire agent had persuaded a dealer in Bolton to supply him under-the-counter (coachbuilders required Austin's prior approval or warranties might be voided) with an Austin 7 chassis.

Lyons, with a sketch of what he wanted, commissioned Cyril Holland, (Note: Cyril Holland (1895–?) was their first fully trained professional coach maker. After his apprenticeship at Lanchester, he had moved around from Birmingham to Yorkshire then back to the Midlands and on to Blackpool joining Swallow in late 1926. Swallow's work appealed to him because as well as prototype and jig-maker he would have to be the draughtsman. He was given a sketch and no more. Known as the "wood butcher" Cyril was a popular man. He held the position of chief body engineer but left in 1945. In 1980 Sir William Lyons said "Without him, I know that we would have had tremendous problems getting our coachbuilding off the ground at all.") a coachbuilder by trade, to create a distinctive, open two seater body. Holland gave it a detachable hardtop with a characteristic back window. The result was announced to public in May 1927, the Austin Seven Swallow. Austin gave their approval to the Swallow coachwork though adjustments were needed, the wings kept falling onto the tyres and the cycle type was dispensed with in favour of the more usual shape. In that form it was taken to London and shown to Henlys — Bert (Herbert Gerald) Henly and Frank Hough — who ordered 500 both two-seaters and saloons.

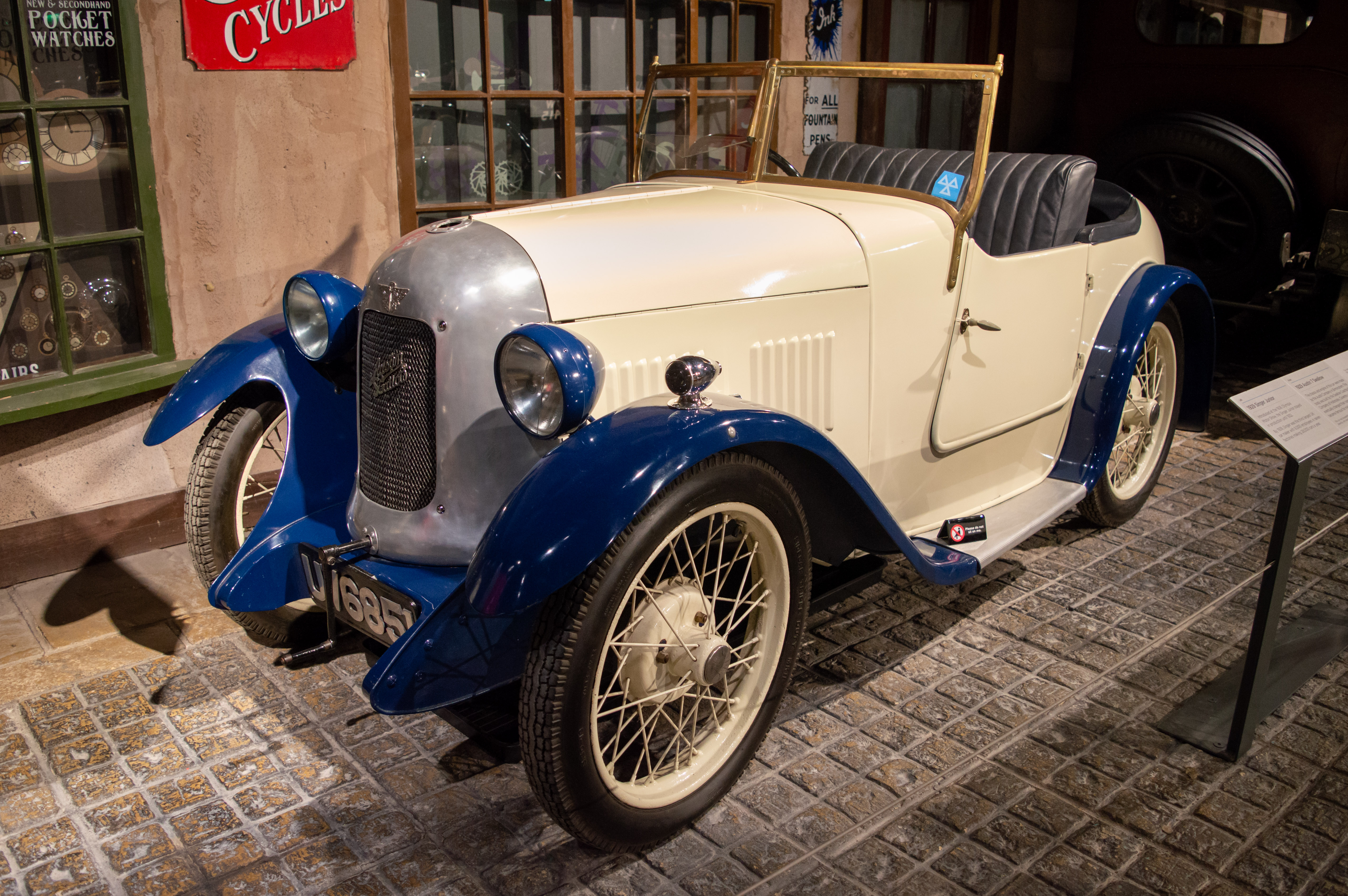
1929 Austin 7 Swallow 2 seater

Priced at only £175, the Swallow, with its brightly coloured two-tone bodywork and a style that imitated the more expensive cars of the time, proved popular in the prosperous late twenties and in the following depression. Soon after, a saloon version was produced: the Austin Seven Swallow Saloon.

=== Swallow Coachbuilding ===
During 1927 the "Sidecar" was dropped from the name, and it became the Swallow Coachbuilding Company.

=== Coventry ===
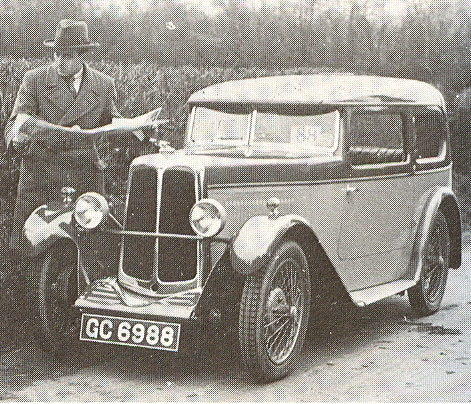
2-door saloon on a 1930 Standard Big Nine chassis

The increasing demand for Swallows made it necessary to move the company closer to the heart of the British car industry and so, in 1928, they moved to a part-disused First World War munitions factory at Holbrook Lane, Coventry. Business continued to grow and in 1929 the owners were confident enough to go to the expense of taking a stand at the London Motor Show.

Three new Swallow models appeared in 1929 on Standard, Swift, and Fiat chassis. Also in 1929 John Black and William Lyons realised a long-standing dream and produced a one of a kind sports car, This "First" SS (Standard Swallow) was a sleek Boat Tail Roadster with a flowing, streamlined design and pointed to an obvious attempt at making a fast car, possibly with the intention of venturing into racing. This car is believed to have been shipped to Australia in the late 40s.

1931 Swallow 2-door 4-seater saloon on an Austin Seven chassis

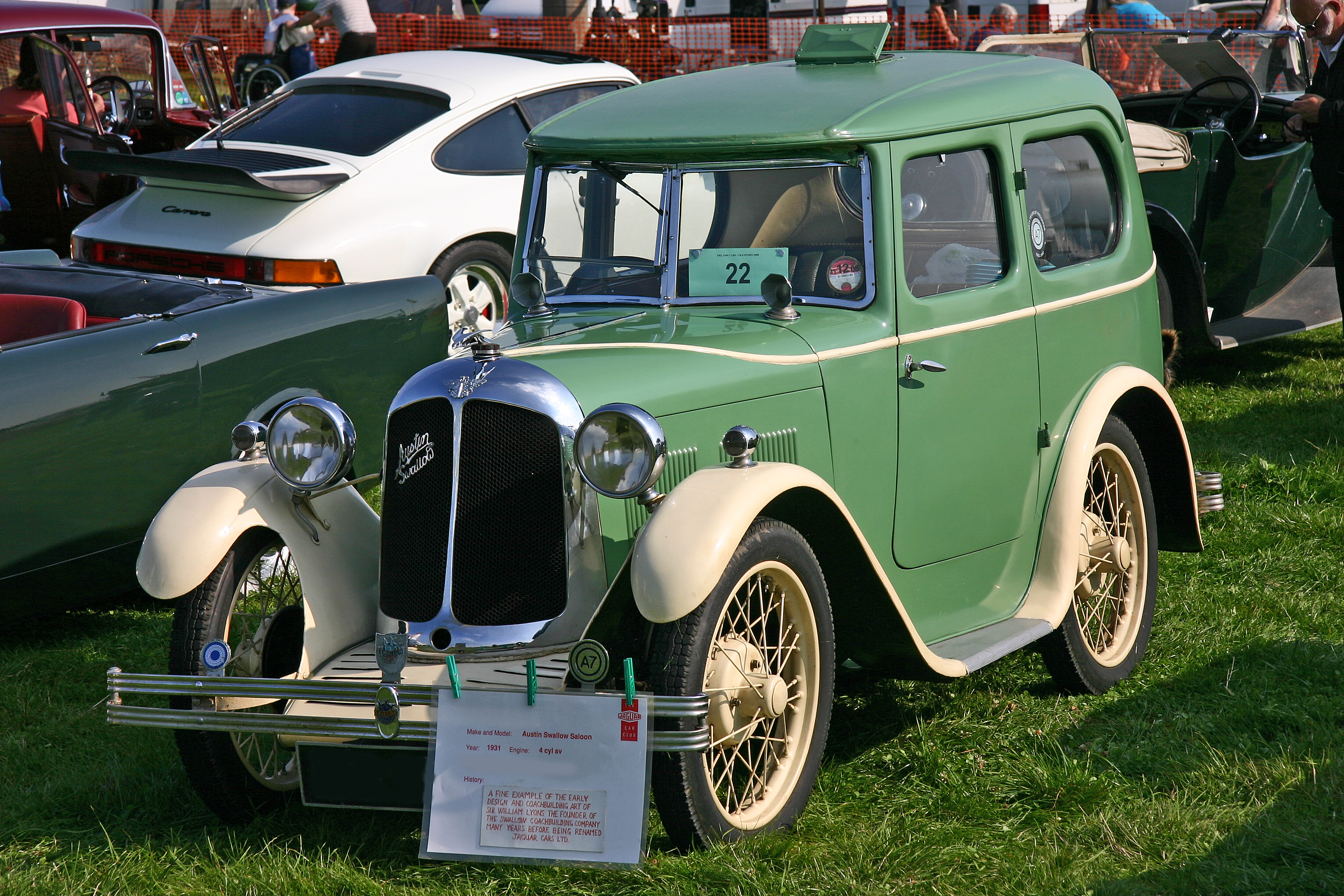

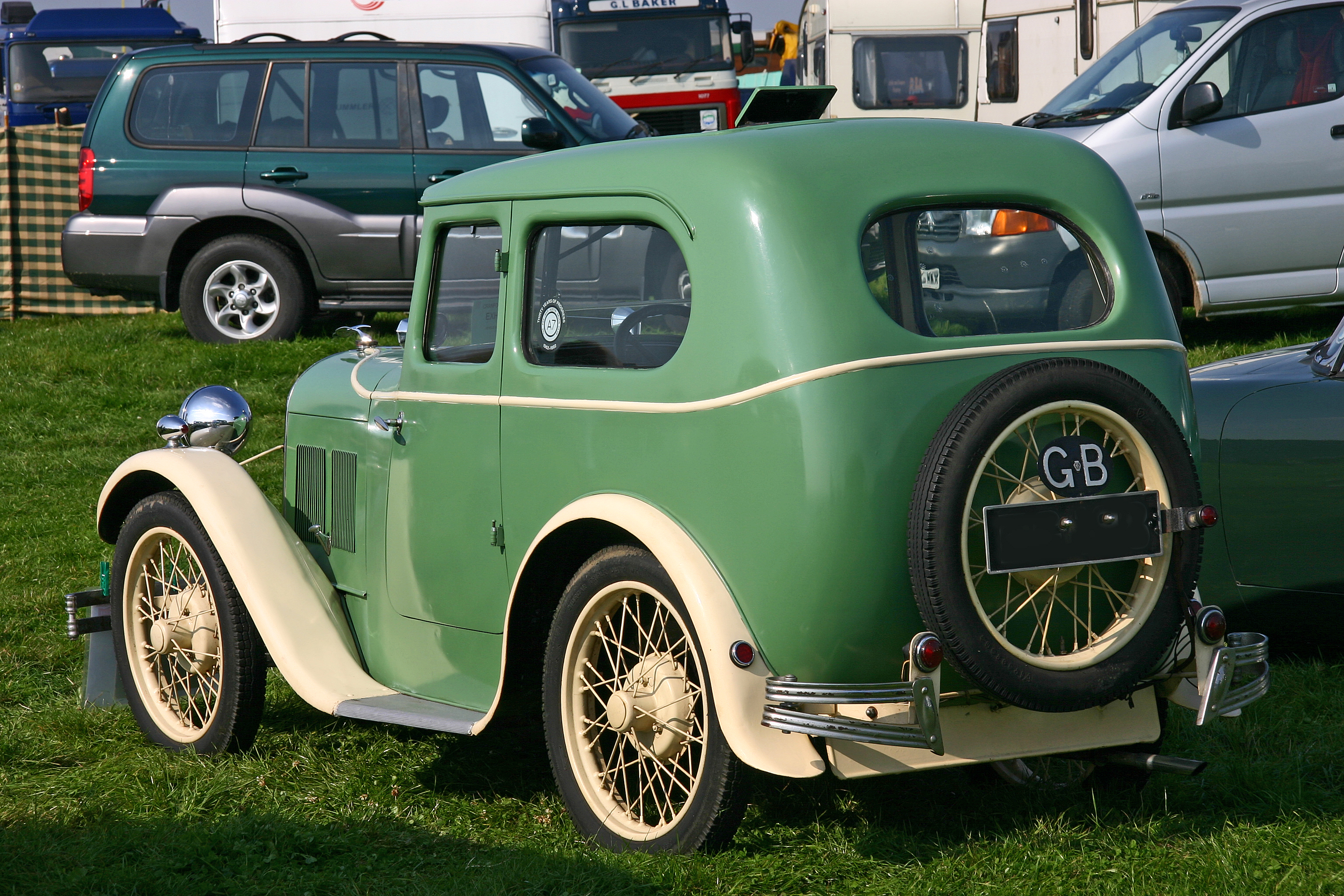

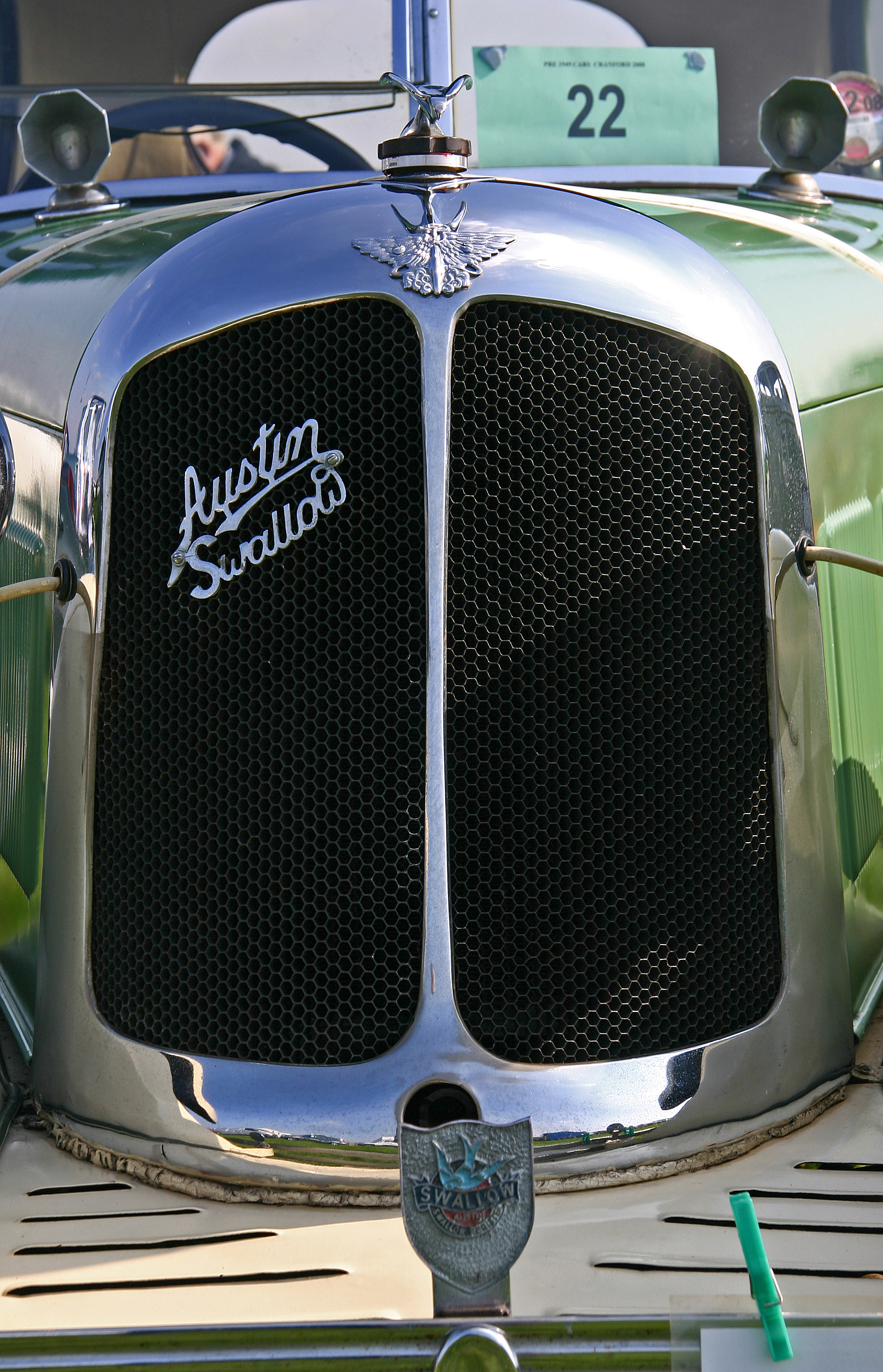

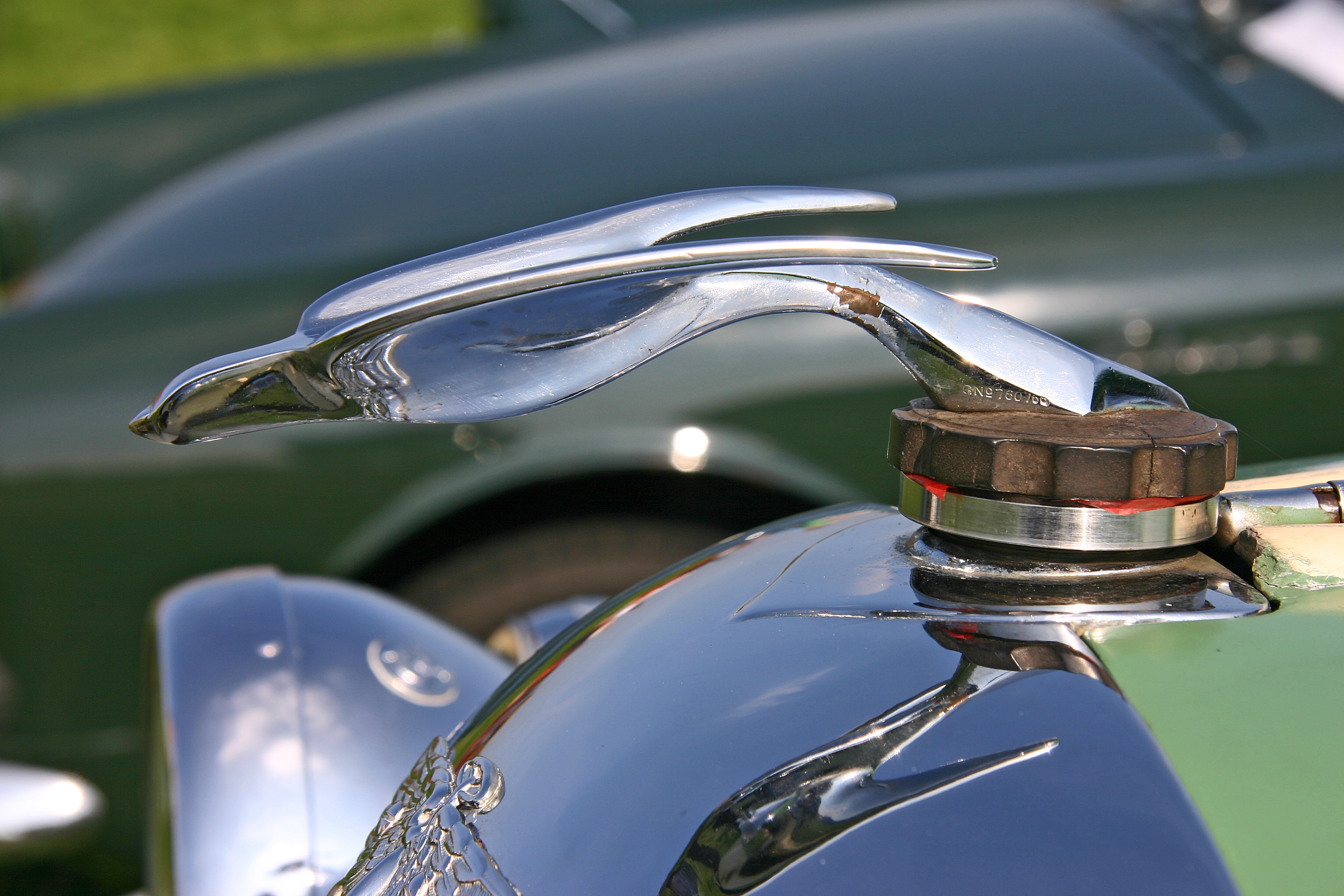

== Swallow Coachbuilding Company Limited ==
Swallow Coachbuilding Company Limited
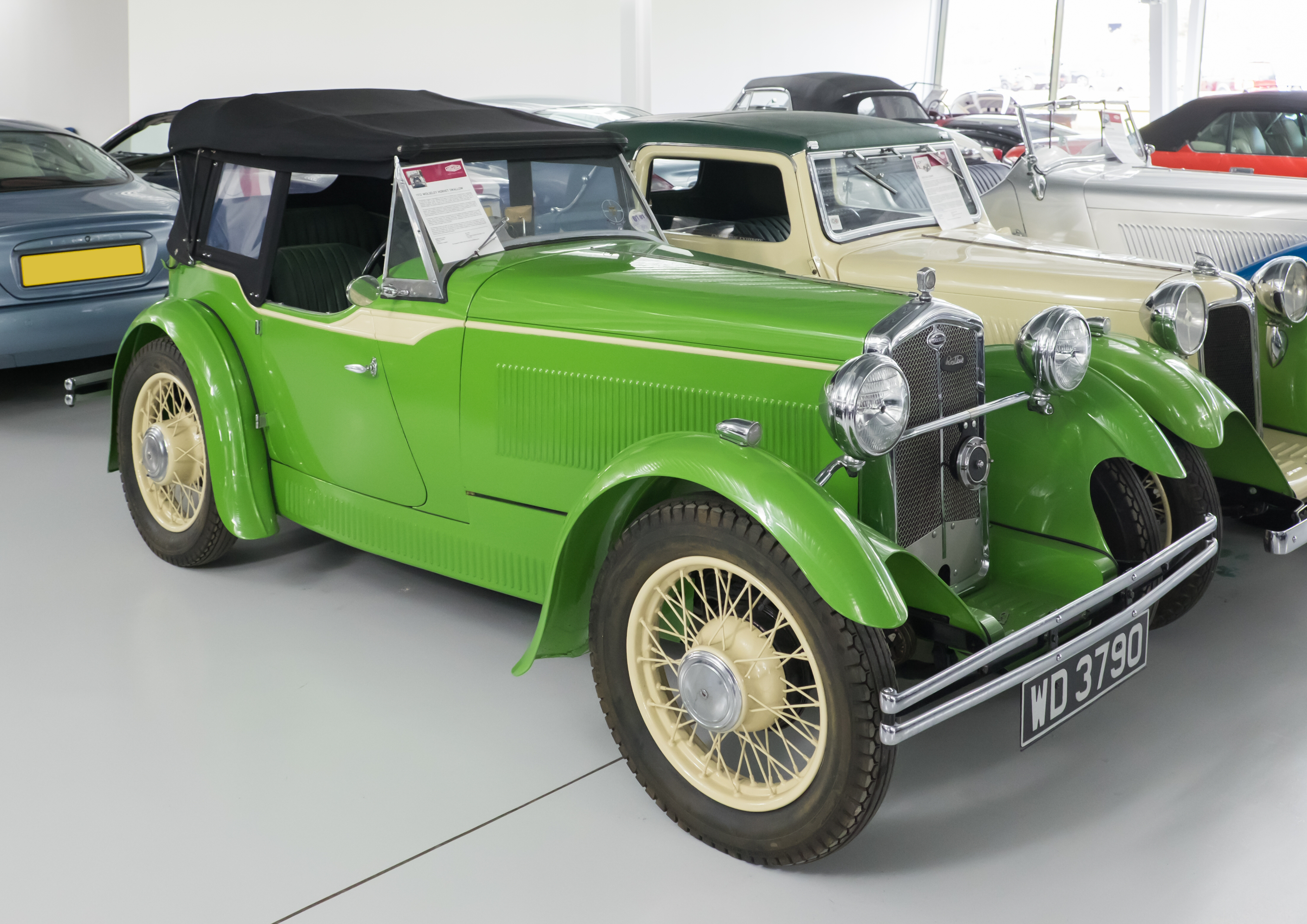
- 1932 Swallow body British Motor Museum
- Industry: Motor vehicle bodies
- Predecessor: Walmsley & Lyons trading as Swallow Coachbuilding Company
- Founded: Coventry, England (1 October 1930)
- Founders: William Walmsley and William Lyons
- Defunct: 1 August 1934
- Fate: Sold to S.S. Cars Limited in 1934
- Successor: S.S. Cars Limited
- Headquarters: Coventry, England
- Key people: William Walmsley and William Lyons
- Products: Sidecars and car bodies
- Brands: Swallow
- Owners: William Walmsley and William Lyons

=== Hornet ===
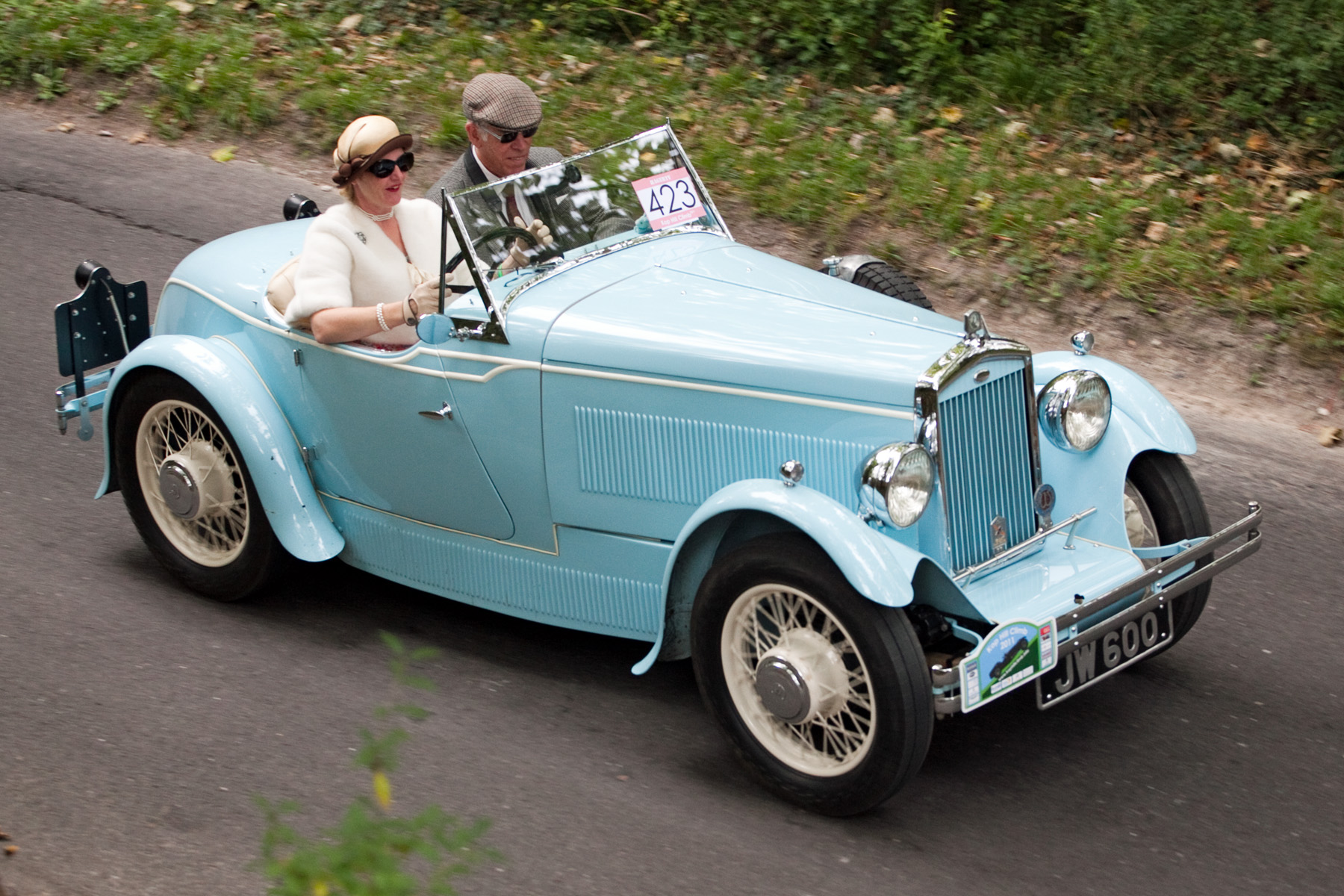
2-seater sports on a 1931 Wolseley Hornet chassis

Bodies on the Wolseley Hornet chassis fitted in well with Swallow's planned new product range. They were the first 6-cylinder Swallows. Production began in January 1931 with an open 2-seater. A 4-seater car followed in that autumn. In April 1932 the new Special chassis arrived and these cars were quite popular. They were the last of the special-bodied Swallows, whose production was replaced in the summer of 1933 by their SS 1 tourer first announced in March 1933.

Production:

- Special Hornets: 2-seaters — 21; 4-seaters — 185
- standard Hornets: 2-seaters — 100+; 4-seaters — 224 (the quantity of 2-seaters made in the first part of 1931 is unknown)

Advertising slogan for the Wolseley Hornet-Swallow cars:
"The Swallow touch that means so much".

=== S S One ===
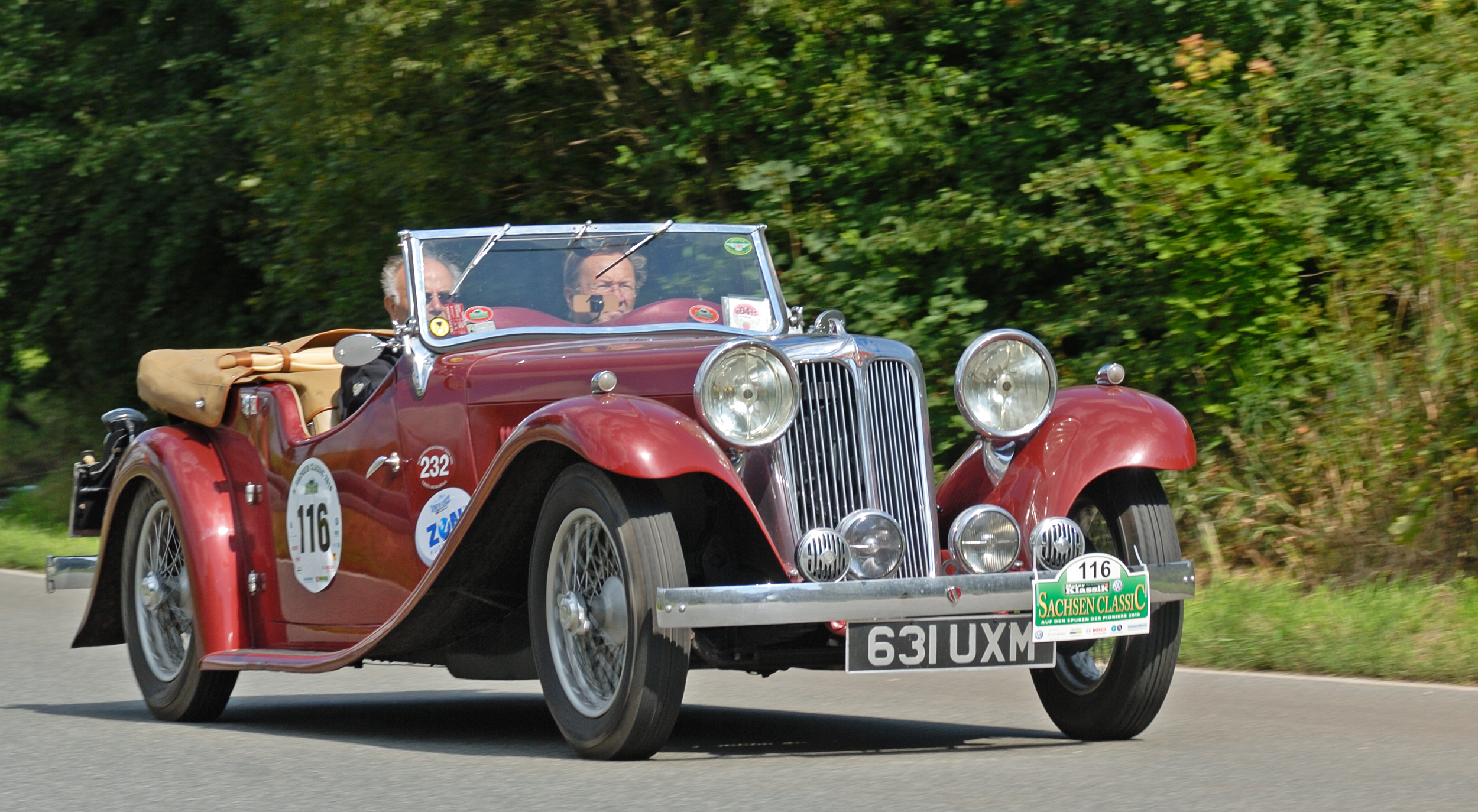
SS 1 tourer on a 1933 Standard Motor Company chassis

Engines and chassis supplied by the Standard Motor Company were fitted with Swallow bodies styled under Lyons supervision. The first of the SS range of cars available to the public was the 1932 SS 1 with 2-litre or 2½-litre side-valve, six-cylinder engine and the SS 2 with a four-cylinder 1-litre side-valve engine. Initially available as coupé or tourer a saloon was added in 1934, when the chassis was modified to be 2 inches (50 mm) wider.

The success of the new range brought about a number of changes. William Walmsley wished to leave this business and it was decided to replace Walmsley's capital by bringing new outside shareholders into a brand-new incorporation, S. S. Cars Limited. (Note: S. S. Cars Limited (Swallow Road, Holbrook Lane, Coventry) was formed to take over that part of the business of the Swallow Coachbuilding Company Limited concerned with the manufacture and sale of S.S. motor-cars. Nominal capital £10,000 in £1 shares.) The new company technically commenced business on 1 February 1934 following its incorporation 26 October 1933. Subsequently, S. S. Cars Limited bought the shares of Swallow Coachbuilding Limited as of 31 July 1934 and Swallow was liquidated (wound up) before S. S. issued shares to the public in January 1935.

== After Swallow ==
=== SS Cars Limited ===
The continued success and expansion of their SS Jaguar range, in particular the sports and saloon cars announced in late 1935 would lead to its new name:

=== Jaguar Cars Limited ===
Towards the end of the war on 23 March 1945 the SS Cars Limited shareholders in general meeting agreed to change the company's name to Jaguar Cars Limited. Said Chairman William Lyons "Unlike S.S. the name Jaguar is distinctive and cannot be connected or confused with any similar foreign name."

Sidecar production was now by Swallow Coachbuilding Co. (1935) Ltd. of Albion Road, Birmingham, 11.

=== Helliwell ===
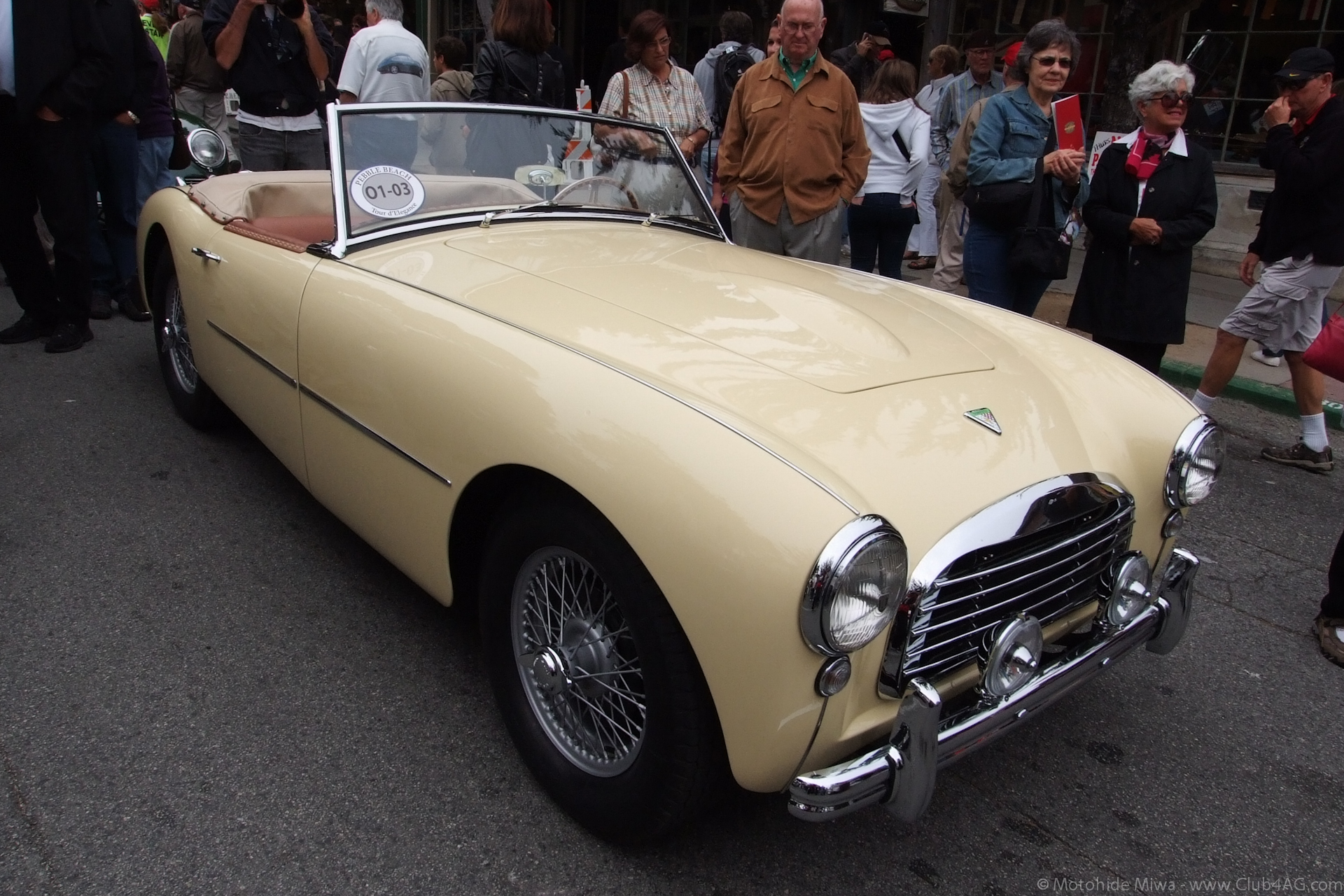
1954 Swallow Doretti by Swallow Coachbuilding (1935)

In January 1946 the Helliwell Group, an aircraft maintenance firm, bought Swallow Coachbuilding Company (1935) Limited from Jaguar Cars Limited. Sidecars produced at Helliwells' Walsall Airport works were built in the same way as the originals and used the same patented trademark. They closed shop in the late 1950s.
