= Standard Eight =

Motor vehicle made in England

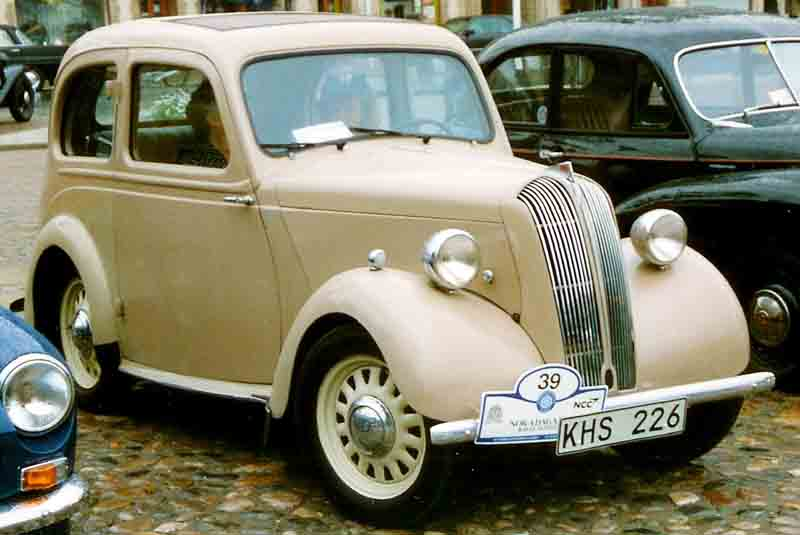
- Standard 8hp Saloon of 1946

Overview
- Manufacturer: Standard-Triumph
- Production: 1938–1959

Chronology
- Predecessor: none
- Successor: Triumph Herald

The Standard Eight is a small car produced by the British Standard Motor Company from 1938 to 1959.

The car was originally launched in 1938 as the Flying Eight. After the Second World War the Flying range of Standards was dropped but an updated car called the 8 hp was re-introduced in 1945. In 1953 a completely new car, the Standard Eight was launched sharing virtually nothing with its predecessor. In 1959 the car was dropped to be replaced by the Triumph Herald, as the Standard brand was being phased out.

== Flying Eight ==
Standard Flying Eight
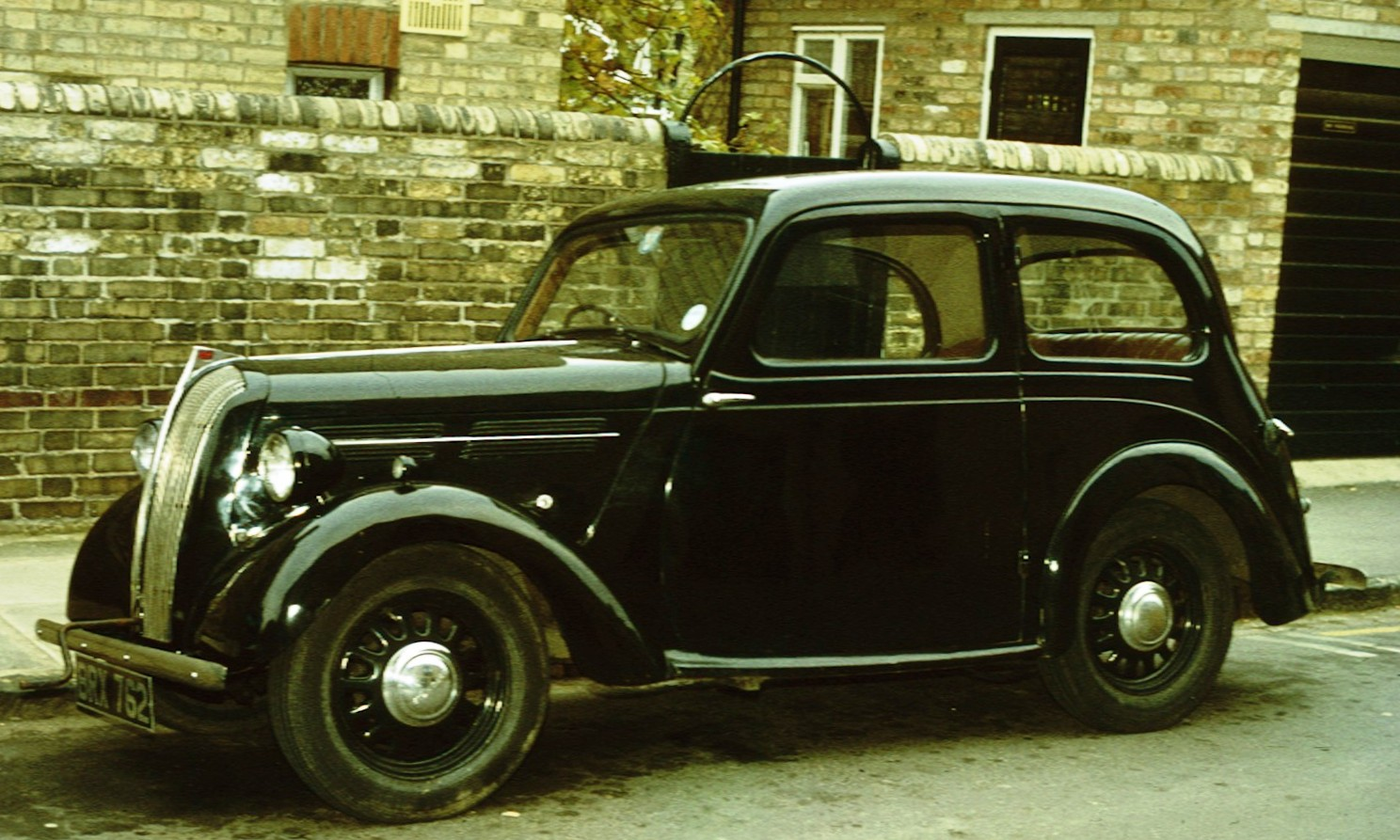
- 1939 Standard Flying Eight Saloon

Overview
- Production: 1938–1941

Body and chassis
- Body style: 2-door saloon; tourer; drophead coupé

Powertrain
- Engine: 1021 cc I4
- Transmission: 3-speed manual

Dimensions
- Wheelbase: 83 in (2,100 mm)
- Length: 139 in (3,500 mm)
- Width: 56 in (1,400 mm)

The Flying Eight was the smallest member of the Standard Flying family. It was launched by the Standard Motor Co Ltd late September 1938, prior to the 1938 Motor Show at Earls Court in October of that year. Apart from the power unit, it was a brand new design, and marked Standard's first entry into the smallest 8 hp market.

The chassis frame was all new, with box section longitudinals, and independent front suspension (ifs) by a transverse leaf spring. It was the first British 8 hp family car to feature ifs. At the same time, an updated Flying Ten and a Flying Twelve were introduced, incorporating the same chassis features. The engine was a development of the previous Flying Nine/Ten, but now with a counterbalanced crankshaft and an aluminium cylinder head. The bore was reduced to 57 mm in order to get into the 8 hp class, while the stroke remained at 100 mm. At 1,021 cc swept volume, maximum power was quoted to 31 bhp at 4,000 rpm. A 3-speed gearbox was used, as well as Bendix mechanical brakes operated by cables.

Two versions were available from the launch of the model: A two-door all-steel saloon, and a 2/4-seat open tourer. The former body was built for Standard by Fisher & Ludlow at a newly erected plant at Tile Hill, Coventry. The open tourer bodies were built by Carbodies at Holyhead Road, Coventry, and these cars were probably also assembled there. These tourers featured cut-down door tops, and a fold-flat windscreen.

Around the turn of the year 1938/39 a drophead coupe became available. This body was built for Standard by Mulliners of Birmingham, who were already building drophead bodies for the Standard Flying Twelve. The initiative for this version probably came from Mulliner's and not from Standard themselves, as it appeared 4–5 months after the original saloon and tourer versions.

The prewar production ledger has not survived. The saloon and tourer prototypes (DDU 514 and −516 respectively) were both registered on 15 February 1938. However, series production of the saloons at Standard's Canley plant seems to have commenced early September 1938, and it seems probable that 23,069 home market (RHD) saloons had been assembled by the end of August 1939 (end of company's 1938/39 financial year). The number of home market open tourers seem to be 1,500 (two batches of 1,000 and 500 respectively). Assembly of these seem to have begun in early November 1938, and continued uninterrupted until about July 1939. Number of drophead coupes were certainly less than 1,000 – only one proper batch of 500 has been identified. 550 left hand drive (LHD) completely knocked down (CKD) sets were supplied to Denmark for assembly by their importers, Bohnstedt-Petersen AS in Copenhagen. 500 of these were saloons, 50 were open tourers. CKD sets were also supplied to Australia, and assembled there by Mortlocks of Perth. For open tourers they used locally built bodies by Richards. The number of Flying Eights assembled in Australia is unknown. Production at Standard's Canley plant continued into the early weeks of 1940. The highest chassis number now known is 33433, a saloon first registered on 11.7.1940. The Glass Guide quotes 34,601 as the final pre-war (saloon?) chassis number.

Performance

The saloon was road tested by The Autocar magazine in their issue of 30 September 1938, and the drophead in the issue of 26 May 1939. Both recorded top speeds very close to 62 mph (100 km/h), and standing start 0–50 mph acceleration figures of 26.2 sec and 25.3 sec respectively – the drophead being 57 lb (26 kg) lighter than the saloon.

Prices

The tourer was priced at £125, the saloon at £129, the saloon de luxe at £139, and the drophead at £159.

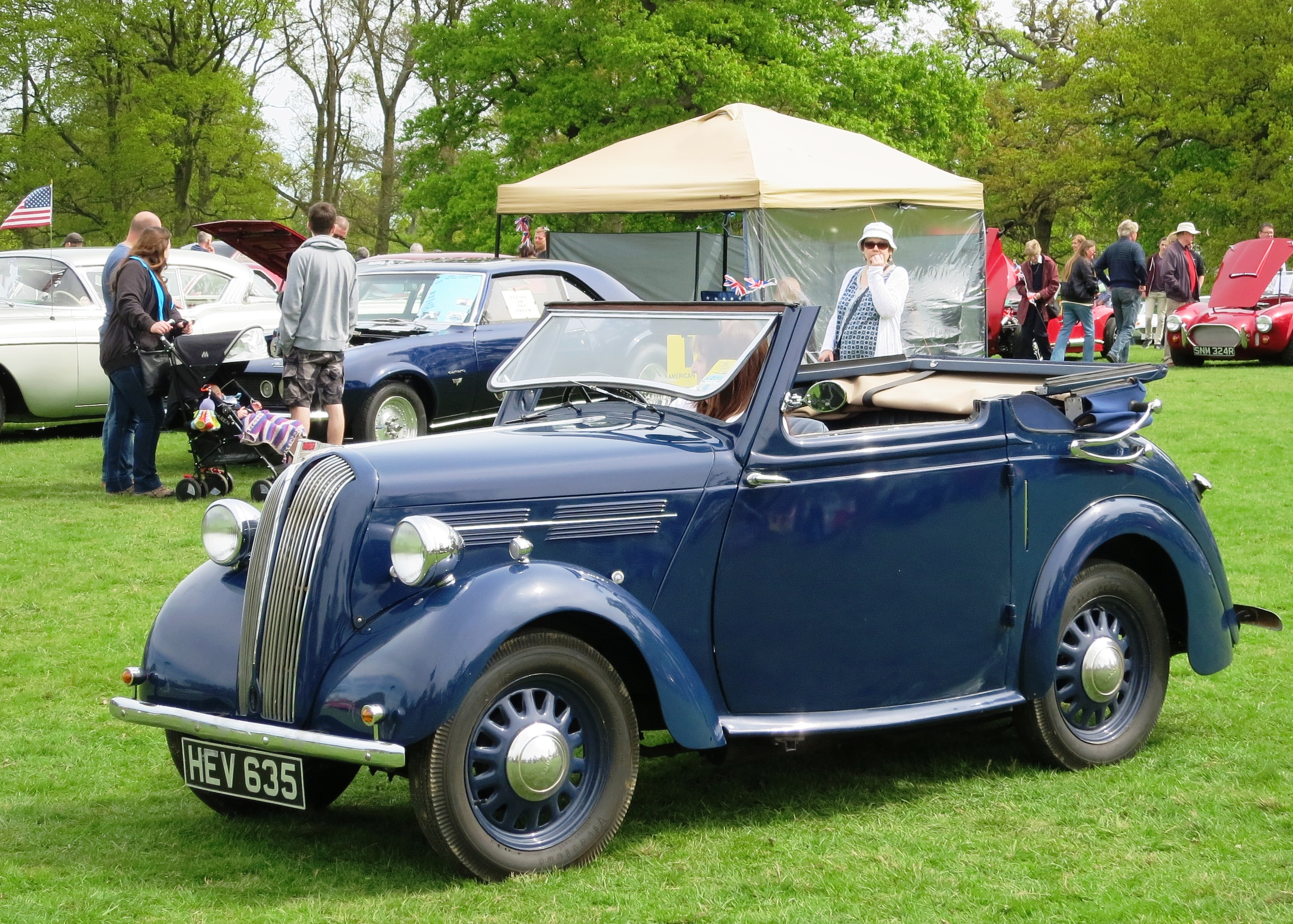
1939 Standard Flying Eight Drop-Head Coupé

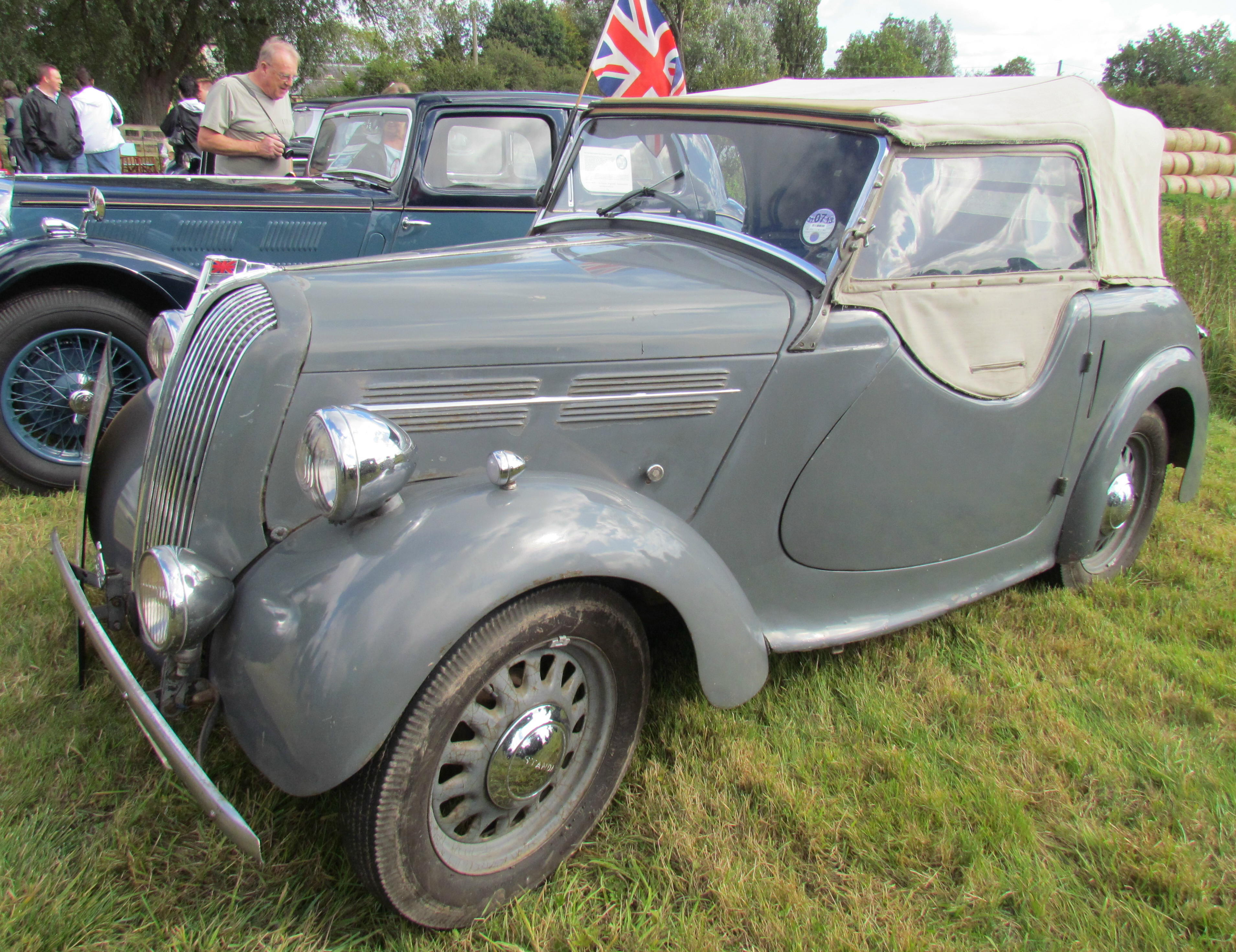
1939 Standard Flying Eight Open Tourer

== 8 hp ==
Standard 8 hp
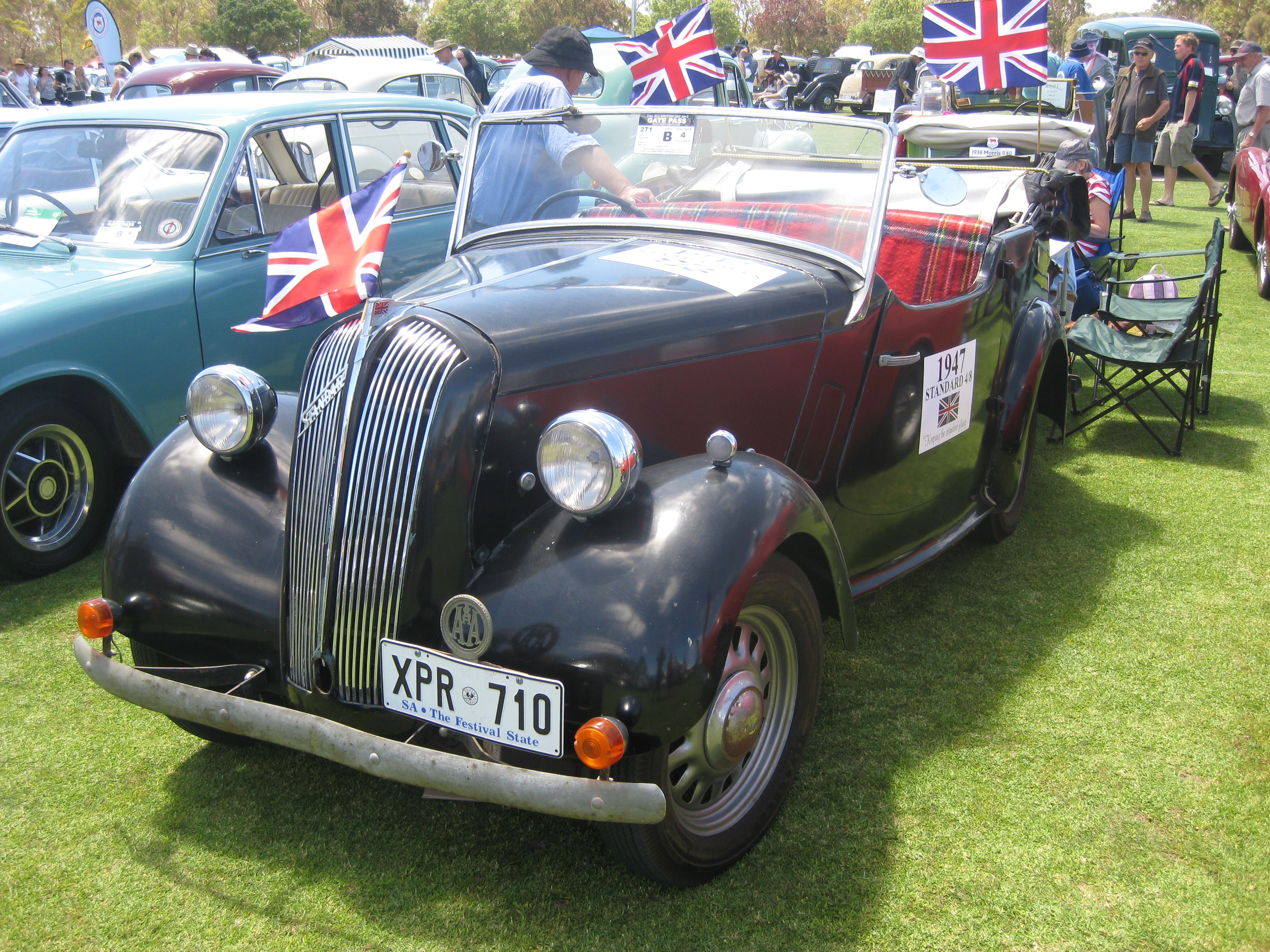
- Standard 8hp Tourer of 1947

Overview
- Also called: Standard 4/8A
- Production: 1945–1948; 53,099 made
- Assembly: United Kingdom; Australia

Body and chassis
- Body style: 2-door saloon; tourer; drophead coupé; estate car

Powertrain
- Engine: 1009 cc I4
- Transmission: Four-speed manual

Dimensions
- Wheelbase: 83 in (2,108 mm)
- Length: 139 in (3,531 mm)
- Width: 56 in (1,422 mm)

The 8 hp model, now without the Flying name, was rapidly re-introduced after the Second World War with the first models appearing within ten days of VE Day. It is sometimes referred to as the Standard 4/8A. The only major update from the pre-war model involved the fitting of a 4-speed gearbox. The cylinder bore was reduced to 56.7 mm, giving 1,009 cc swept volume while dropping the tax horsepower rating from 8.06 to 7.98 as the rules for rounding off numbers had been changed. Maximum power was now quoted to 28 bhp at 4,000 rpm. The absence of bonnet louvres on the 8 hp model provided visual differentiation from the pre-war Flying Eight. The pre-war tourer body by Carbodies was dropped, being replaced by a new tourer body in the form of a simplified drophead coupe, with cut-down door tops, detachable sidescreens and a fixed windscreen frame. Estate cars were produced in 1948 only and were not on general sale.

The car was pitched by Standard against the Austin 8 and Morris Eight rivals and was priced at £314.

After this version of the 8 was phased out, Standard-Triumph's next small car was the Triumph Mayflower. It was only after this model had failed to meet its sales targets that a new Standard Eight was launched.

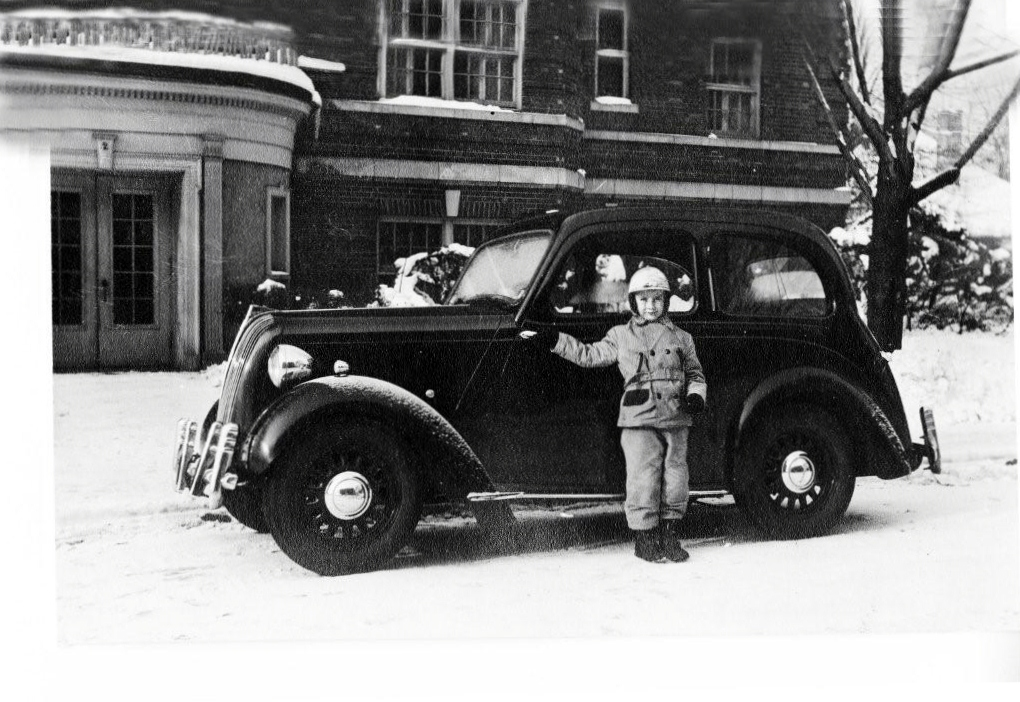
Standard 8 Saloon 1947/48

== Eight ==
Standard Eight
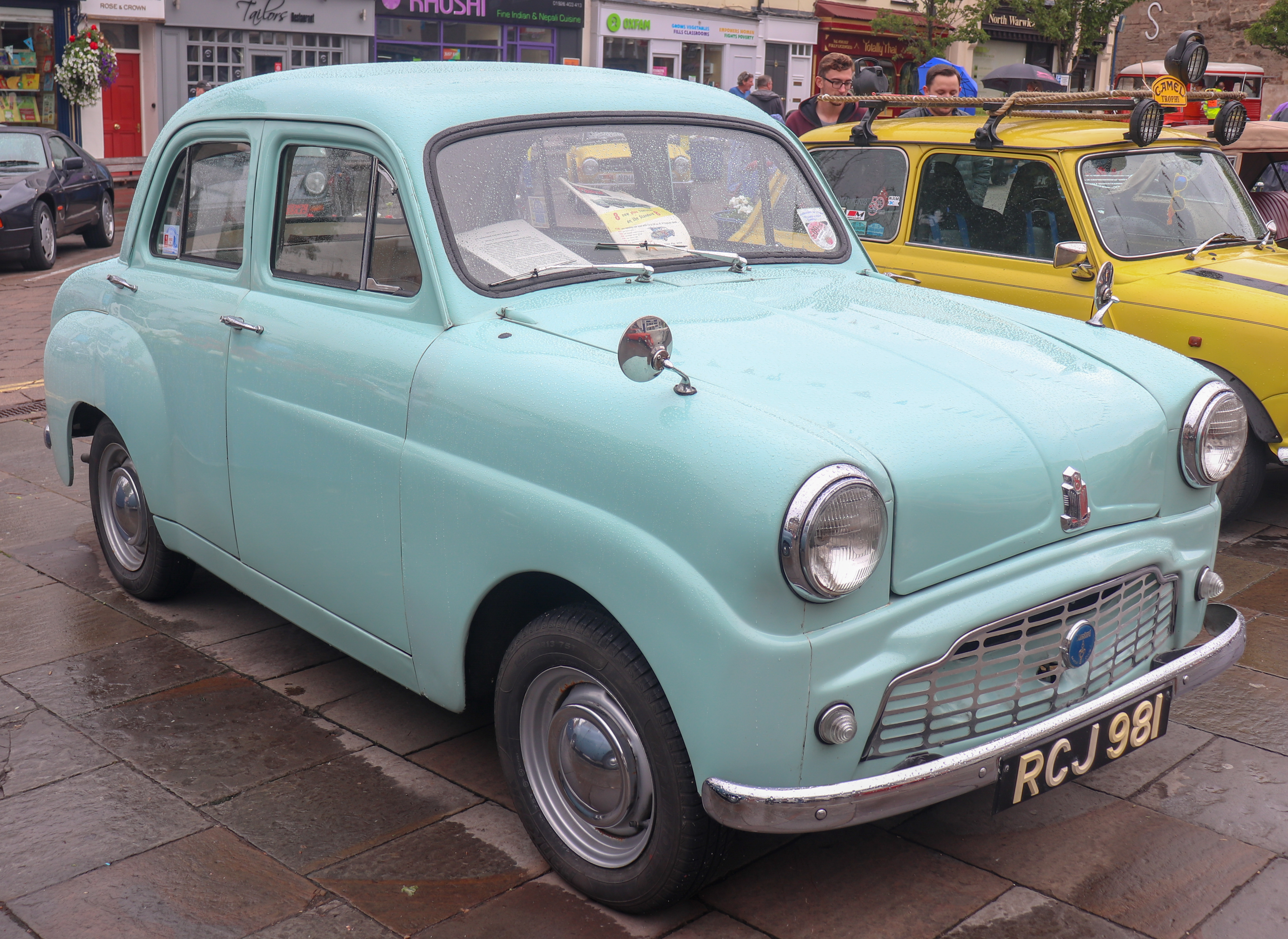

Overview
- Also called: Vanguard Cadet
- Production: 1953–1959; 136,317 made
- Designer: Vic Hammond

Body and chassis
- Body style: 4-door saloon

Powertrain
- Engine: 803 cc SC OHV I4
- Transmission: Four-speed manual; optional overdrive

Dimensions
- Wheelbase: 84 in (2,134 mm)
- Length: 144 in (3,658 mm)
- Width: 60 in (1,524 mm)

The 1953 Eight was a completely new car with unit construction and the new Standard SC overhead valve engine. It was offered only as a 4-door saloon. The new overhead valve engine of 803 cc produced slightly less power than the outgoing larger side-valve unit with 26 bhp at 4500 rpm but this was increased to 30 bhp at 5000 rpm in 1957. The 4-speed gearbox, with synchromesh on the top three ratios, was available with optional overdrive from March 1957. Girling hydraulic drum brakes were fitted.

To keep prices down, the car at launch was very basic with sliding windows, single windscreen wiper and no external boot lid. Access to the boot was by folding down the rear seat, which had the backrest divided in two (an innovation copied in saloons from late 1980s onward to extend their boot-space into the passenger-compartment). The 1954 De luxe got wind up windows and the Gold Star model of 1957 an opening boot lid. From mid-1955 all the Eights finally got wind up windows. At launch the car cost £481 including taxes on the home market.

An example tested by The Motor magazine in 1953 had a top speed of 61 mph (98 km/h) and could accelerate from 0–50 mph (80 km/h) in 26.5 seconds. A fuel consumption of 43 miles per imperial gallon (6.6 L/100 km; 36 mpg_{‑US}) was recorded.

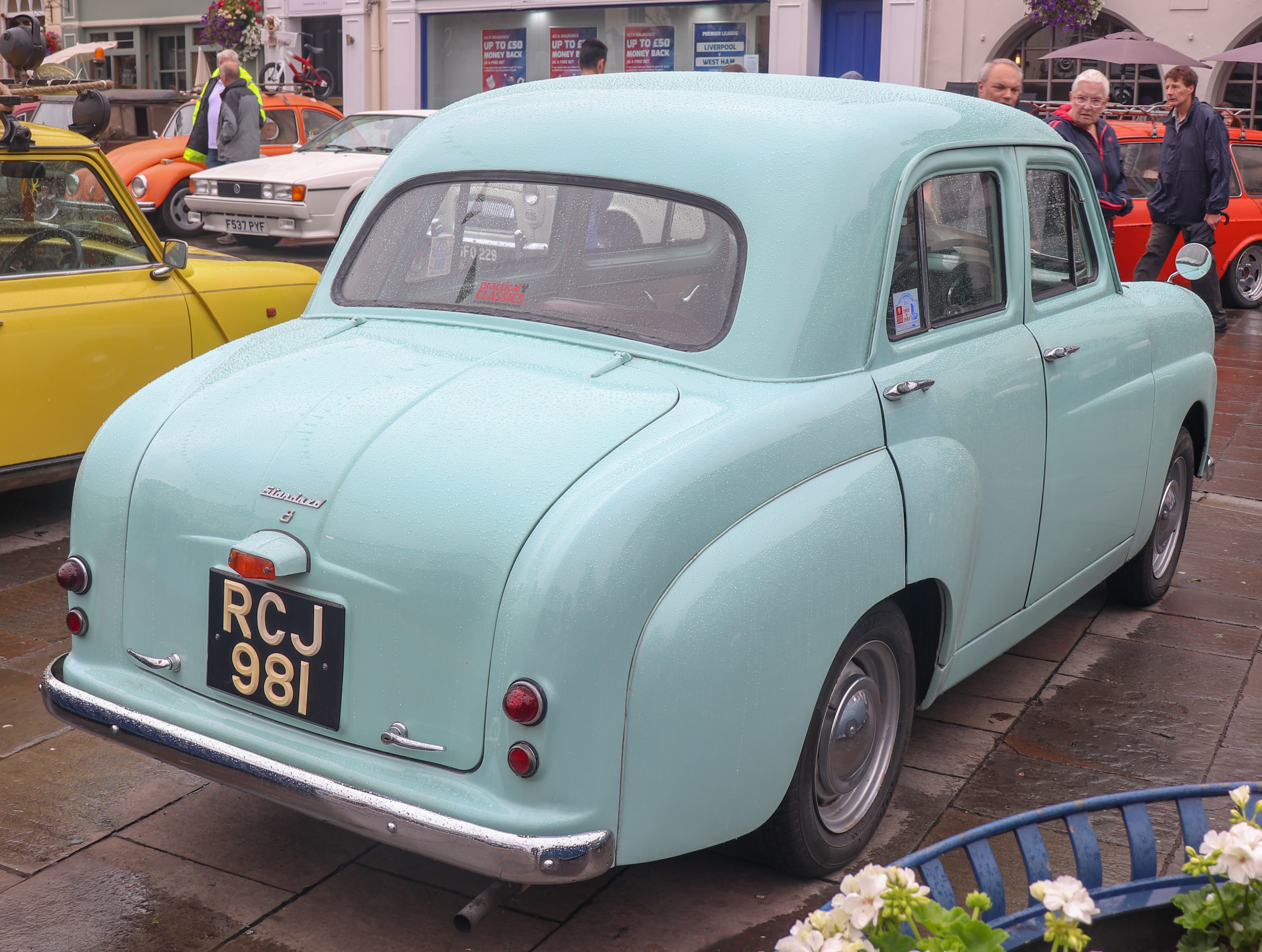
Standard 8 (1958)

The Standard Ten of 1954 shared the bodyshell and running gear and would outlast the Eight by continuing until 1961.

== Replacement ==
The Eight was replaced in 1959 by the Triumph Herald, which used a slightly enlarged version of the same engine.

== Film appearances ==
A Standard 4/8A Tourer is driven by the main characters in the 1951 film, The Man from Planet X.
