= Standard Little Nine =

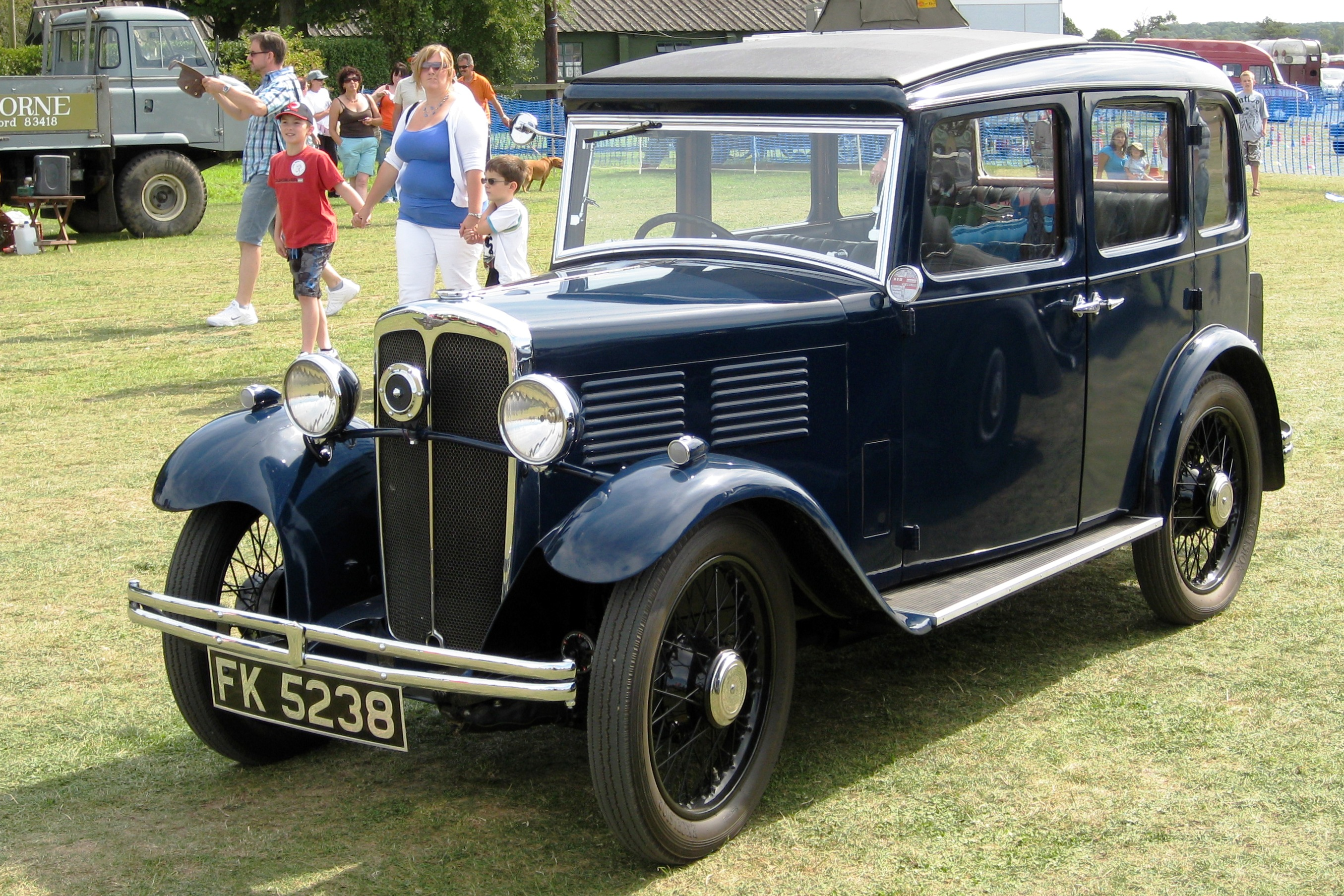

Overview
- Manufacturer: Standard Motor Company
- Production: 1930-1933

Body and chassis
- Body style: 4-door saloon production 5,680 cars. 2-door convertible production 12 cars.

Powertrain
- Engine: 1,005 cc Nine sv I4; 1,052 cc Nine sv I4
- Transmission: 3-speed manual

Dimensions
- Wheelbase: 2,210 mm (87 in); 2,311 mm (91 in)
- Length: 3,366 mm (133 in)
- Width: 1,359 mm (54 in)

Chronology
- Predecessor: Standard Nine
- Successor: Standard Flying Nine

The "Little Nine" is a family car produced by the British Standard Motor Company between 1930 and 1933. It was the smallest in the range of cars offered by the company in the early-1930s, appearing some two years after the demise, in 1929, of the 9.9 bhp (7 kW; 10 PS) Standard Teignmouth. The car was relatively expensive compared to its peers but became popular among the upper echelons of society.

The 1,005 cc side-valve engine was replaced three years after launch, in 1934, when the bore was extended. The slightly larger unit now displaced 1,052 cc. Claimed maximum power was 22 bhp (16 kW; 22 PS). and was delivered to the rear wheels via a 3-speed gearbox.

The car was made in Saloon form and a few 2-door convertibles were made on special order, making them extremely rare.

In 1936 production came to an end and the car was replaced by the more streamlined and wider Flying Nine model.
