= Magic Midget =

1930s racing car

The Magic Midgets were a number of record-breaking 750cc "midget" MG cars of the 1930s. They were most notably, but not always, driven by George Eyston.

Although of small engine capacity, they were frequently supercharged to increase performance. Never as fast as the aero-engined land speed record behemoths driven by the likes of Henry Segrave, they set numerous speed records for their engine capacity class.

== EX120 ==
In 1929, MG were attempting to develop their M-type Midget for racing. The rear axle leaf springs were mounted in sliding trunnions at the rear end, rather than the more usual shackles. The improved axle location encouraged good handling, which compensated when racing for the 750cc engine's low power output. Captain George Eyston and Ernest Eldridge saw this chassis under development and decided that it could form the basis for a speed record breaker. Fitted with larger brakes from a Mark II, a four speed gearbox and streamlined bodywork, it became the EX120. On 30 December 1930 at Montlhéry, EX120 set its first records, beating the Austin Sevens.

In search of even faster speeds, it was decided to supercharge the car, using Eyston's own Powerplus design of supercharger. In February 1931, again at Montlhéry, this became the first 750cc car to exceed 100 mph, at 103.13 mph.

After this success, MG were prompted to produce a racing replica of it: the C-type or Montlhéry Midget, which was available with or without supercharger.

Eyston was never satisfied with merely reaching a speed when he could use the same car to break several records by maintaining it for longer periods. He set out to hold 100 mph for an hour, using EX120. The car reached this speed, but then the engine caught fire. Still at a speed of around 60 mph, the Eyston's tall figure managed to jump from the tiny enclosed cockpit, counting on his past fox-hunting experience to roll through the landing without serious injury. The car was destroyed, and Eyston then filed another of his many patents for fire-proof asbestos overalls.

=== Related Brooklands Photo Archive photographs ===
View of MG with driver (from above). Round-topped aeroscreen.

Eyston in Magic Midget (EX120). Front R quarter view (newsprint photograph reproduction). No screen.

Eyston in Magic Midget (EX120?), detail of cockpit rear LH wheel and tail. Small square flush-mounted screen.

== EX127 ==
EX127 at 119.48 mph on Pendine Sands

EX127 was built for Eyston, but initially driven by Eldridge. With this car, MG claimed a number of class records at Montlhéry in late 1931 and reached a speed of 119.48 mph on Pendine Sands in February 1932.

== EX135 ==
This was built for Eyston in 1933, based on the supercharged K3 Magnette. It had two alternative bodyshells: one with the usual exposed wheels for racing, the other a full-width streamlined body for record-breaking.

In 1935 Eyston sold it to Goldie Gardner, who then had Reid Railton re-design another bodyshell for it.

== See also ==
- Goldie Gardner
- EX181 (MGA- based Speed Record Car of the 1950s)
