= Humber 15 =

Humber 15.9
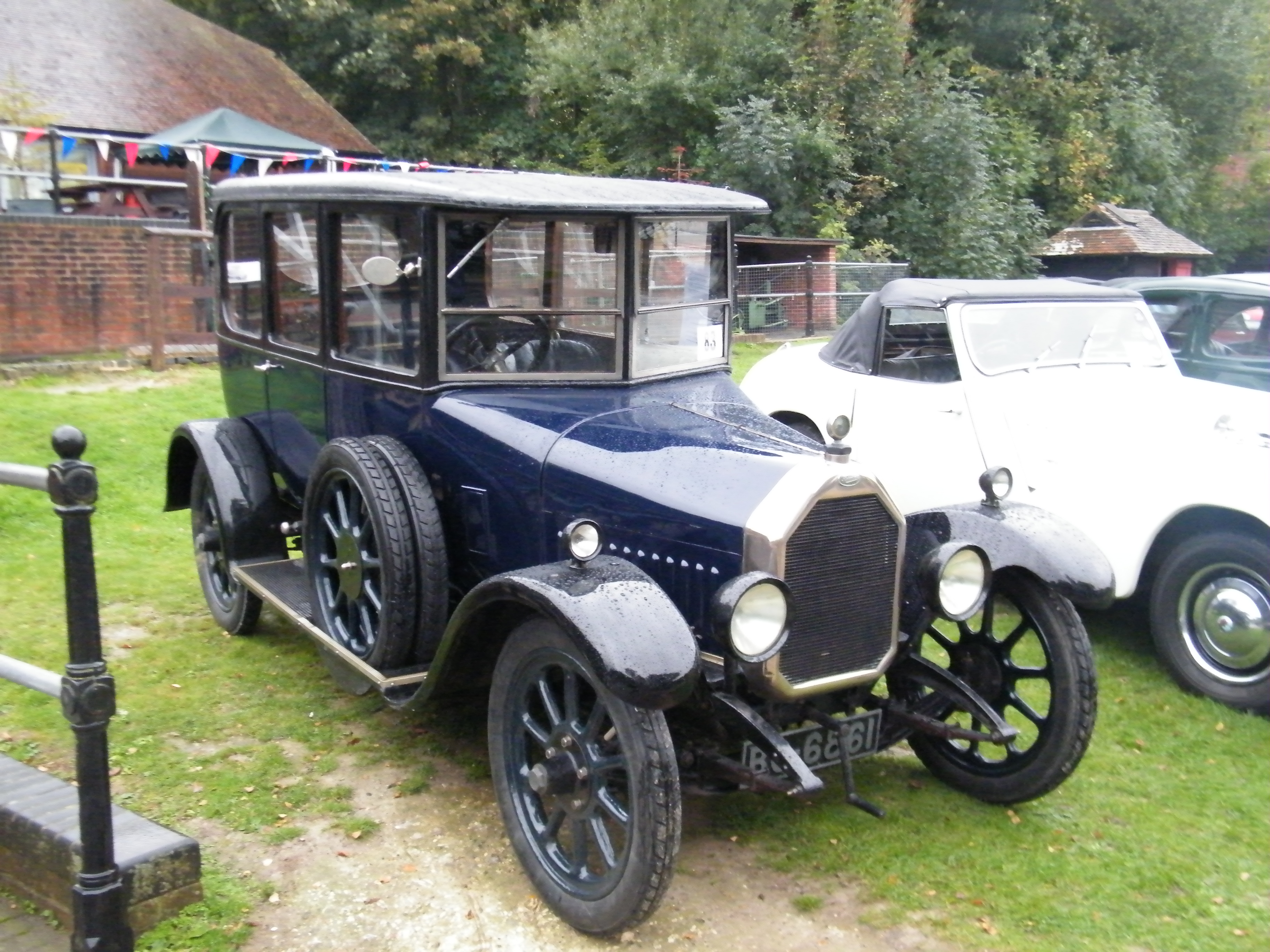
- 3-door saloon registered January 1924

Overview
- Manufacturer: Humber Limited
- Production: 1919–1928

Body and chassis
- Body style: 5-seater open tourer (AllWeather); 3-door saloon (spare is by driver); saloon landaulette; chassis only also available
- Layout: FR

Powertrain
- Engine: 2815 cc Straight-4
- Transmission: enclosed Ferodo-lined clutch, a short Hardy disc-jointed shaft to the four-speed gearbox which is held at four points with its control by driver's right hand, open propeller shaft with one fabric (front) and one metal universal joint to bevel driven rear axle

Dimensions
- Wheelbase: 123.5 in (3,137 mm); Track 57 in (1,448 mm)
- Length: 173 in (4,394 mm)
- Width: 69 in (1,753 mm)
- Kerb weight: Saloon 31 cwt, 3,472 lb (1,575 kg)

Chronology
- Predecessor: Humber 20
- Successor: Humber 15/40

Humber 15.9 engine

Layout
- Configuration: Straight 4-cylinder
- Displacement: 2,815 cc (171.8 cu in)
- Cylinder bore: 80 mm (3.15 in)
- Piston stroke: 140 mm (5.51 in)
- Cylinder block material: cast-iron monobloc suspended at four points
- Cylinder head material: cast-iron detachable
- Valvetrain: overhead inlet, side-by-side exhaust; tappets, pushrods and rockers; force-feed lubrication; timing by chain

Combustion
- Fuel system: Cox Atmos carburettor with air-intake muffler and strangler control on instrument panel; fuel delivered by vacuum and gravity
- Management: magneto and CAV generator
- Fuel type: petrol
- Oil system: splash and gravity feed from a reservoir filled by gears from sump, there is a dipper gauge
- Cooling system: radiator, fan and linked water impeller for circulation

Output
- Power output: 40 bhp (30 kW; 41 PS) @not provided rpm; elsewhere 33 bhp @2000 rpm; Tax horsepower 15.9

Chronology
- Predecessor: Humber 20
- Successor: Humber 15/40

Humber Fifteen 15 horsepower cars were medium to large cars, classified as medium weight, with a less powerful than usual engine which attracted less annual taxation and provided more stately progress. The coachwork was superbly finished, especially the tourers, and these cars were much favoured by the professional classes.

They were manufactured from 1919 to 1924 and 1924 to 1927. Their former place in Humber's catalogue was bracketed in 1927 and 1928 by new cars, a much smaller engined 14/40 or late in the same year a 20-horsepower six-cylinder 20/55 of ten per cent greater capacity.

== Introduction ==
These cars were displayed at Olympia's first postwar Motor Show in November 1919. Commentators described the design as common-sense and not sensational with evident attention to detail. The blue saloon with shining black roof and mouldings drew attention.

== Fifteen .9 ==
=== Engine ===
The 2.8 Litre four cylinders in line engine made in a single casting had a detachable cylinder head and was fitted with, new for Humber, overhead inlet, side-by-side exhaust valves. Their equivalent prewar car with an engine of 3.3 Litres had twin overhead camshafts.

=== Bodies ===
The 15.9 was available as a saloon or a 5-seater tourer. There was no door for the driver because the brake lever and gear change lever were to his right and the spare wheel and tyre were fastened to the outside of the car at the same point.

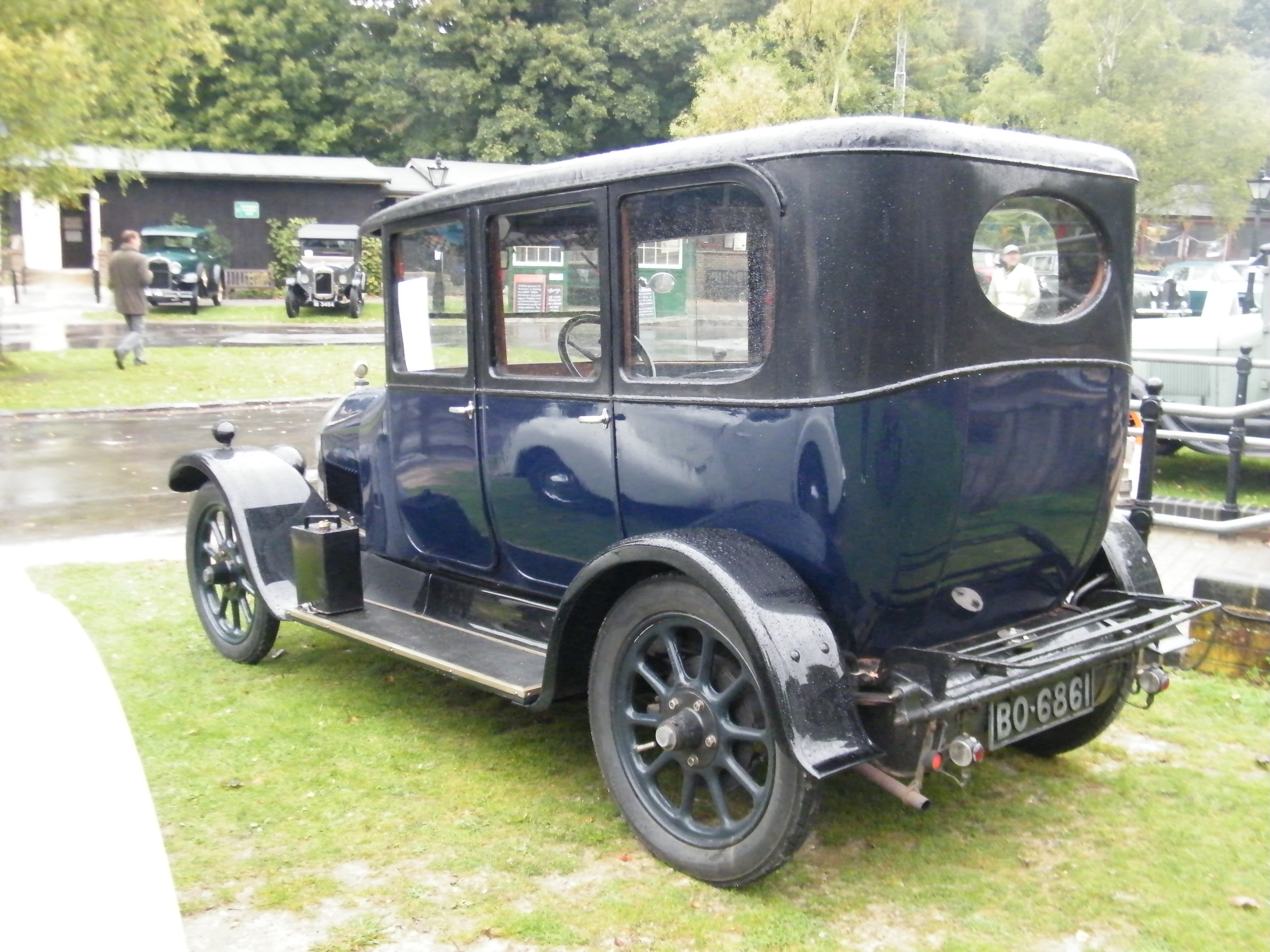

A special pull control for the CAV starter was mounted on the dashboard. The steering wheel carried an advance and retard (timing) lever and an ignition switch. Steering column rake was adjustable The split windscreen reached down to the curved dash without a wooden fillet. Its instrument panel included a cupboard and two drawers and a Jaeger speedometer run from the gearbox. There was also a clock and an air control. There were scuttle ventilators. Beneath the bonnet there was storage for the wheelbrace, jack, oil-can etc., small tools were in the passenger's side front door and there was a further locker below the front floorboards

The tourer had some special features. Humber claimed this open tourer converted to an All-Weather car in a few seconds. The aluminium-framed celluloid side curtains, carried neatly below the driver's seat, could stay up when the hood was lowered. For the back seat passengers there was a combined rear cowl and screens. The cowl covered passengers' knees and two single windscreens by Auster carried inside the cowl, when needed, were mounted in slots on the cowl and secured by butterfly nuts. The cowl itself was quickly released when the all-weather configuration was wanted. Later cars were given a single large Auster windscreen with hinged wings at each side to give passengers further wind-protection.

A saloon landaulette was added to the standard range and it also showed the care and forethought put in to give comfort and convenience. Between front and back seats it had a glass partition with sliding panels and there was an extra fold-away seat in the rear compartment which might be turned to face either side.

=== Brakes suspension steering ===
The hand lever to the driver's right by the change-speed lever operated internal expanding brakes on the back wheels, the foot brake pedal operated a contracting band on a drum just behind the gearbox. A hand adjustment for wear was provided for both rear and transmission brakes. The Times thought the suspension was not quite free from fore and aft movement but was otherwise satisfactory and comfortable on a rough road. The springs were set with a minimum of camber, they were half-elliptical, set on top of the axles and from 1923 Hartford shock absorbers were fitted at the back. Steering was by worm and complete wheel and could be adjusted for wear

=== Test ===
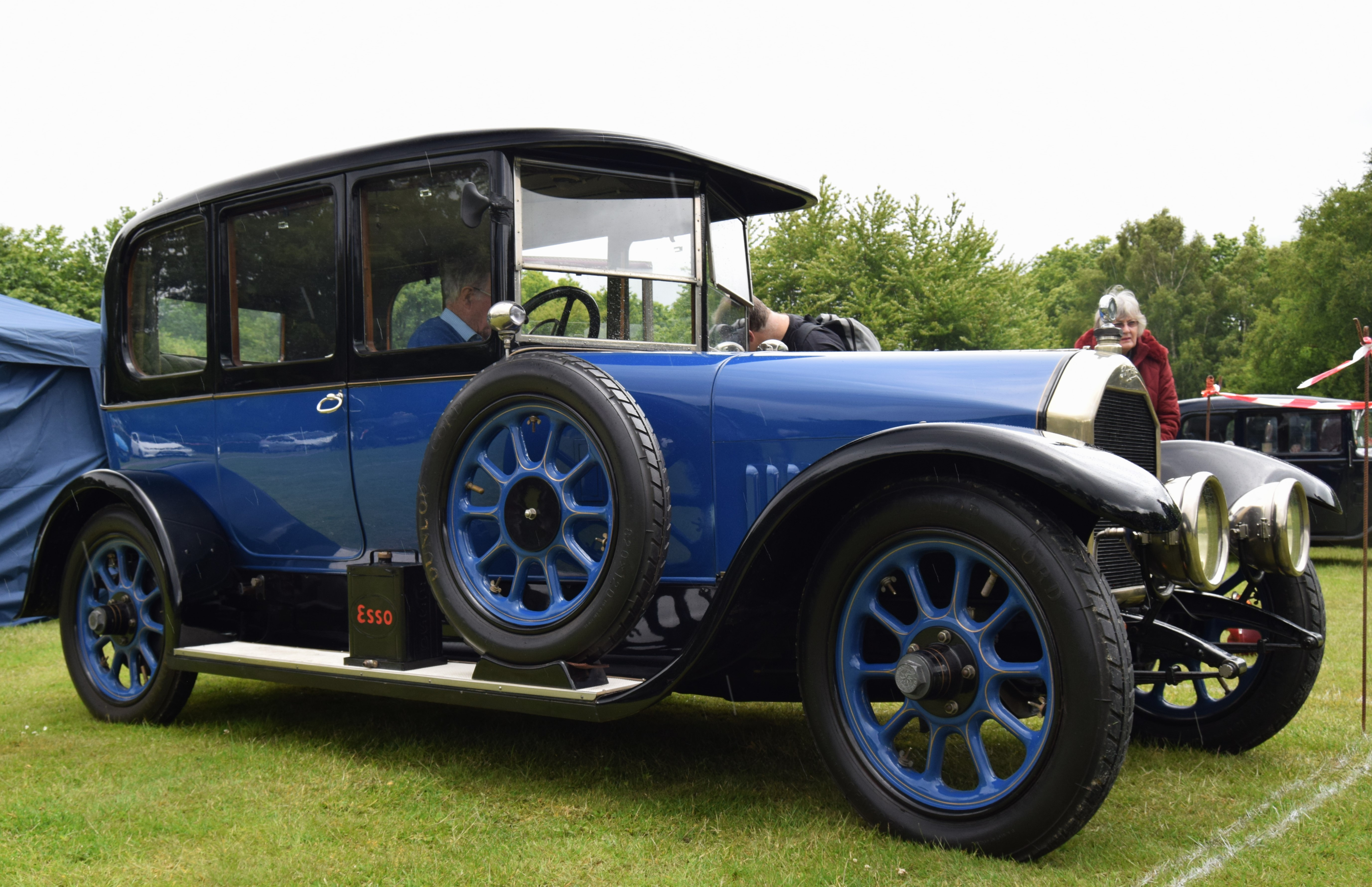
1920 saloon

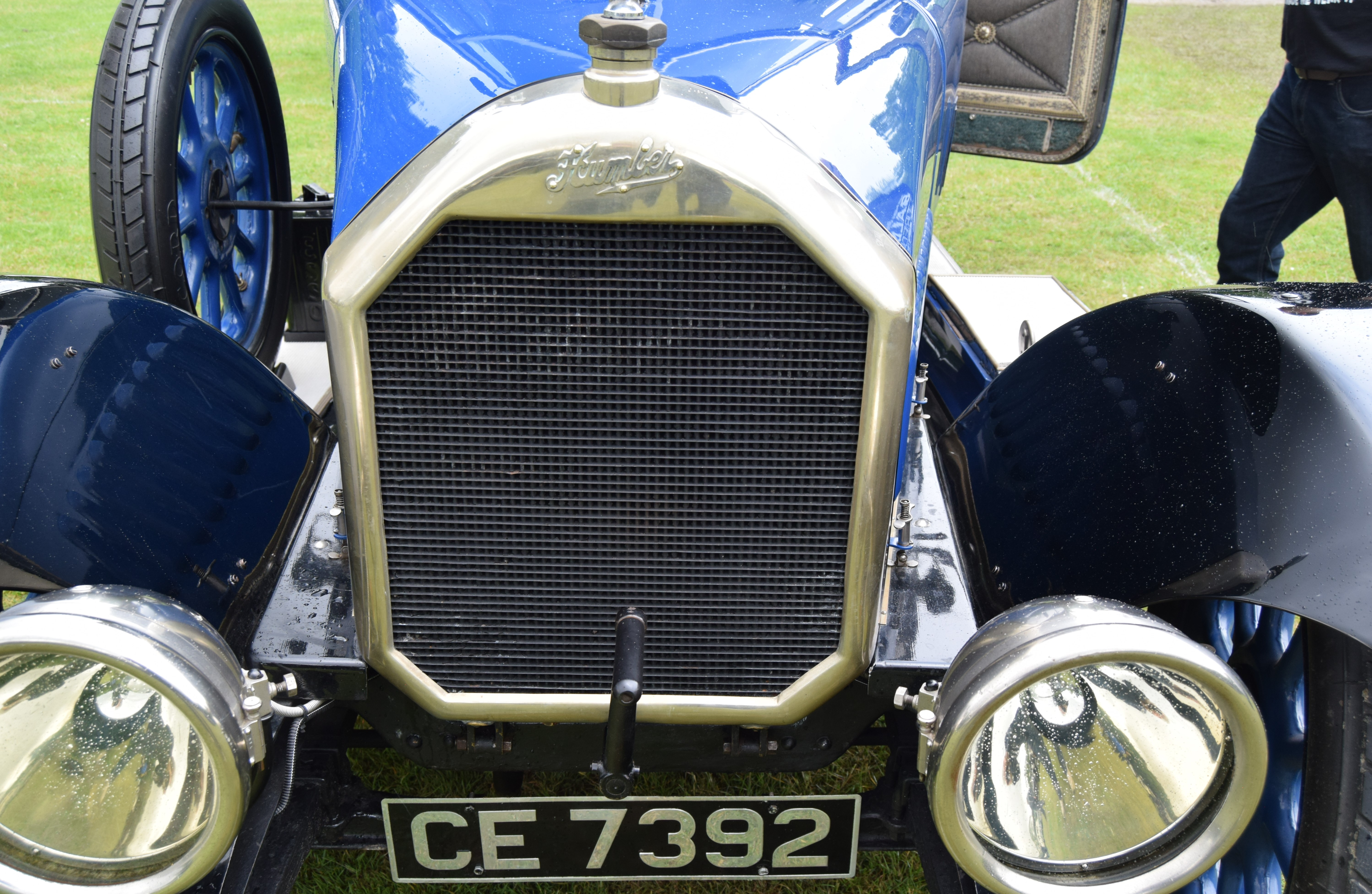

A road test of Humber's Fifteen horsepower five-seater open tourer by the motoring correspondent of The Times resulted in published comments along the following lines. The Fifteen is an expensive car but, without an employee for the purpose, an owner who drives it himself is expected to care for its every need, daily.

The owner-driver's needs seem to have been considered very carefully and all but one of them met, that is the difficulty in draining engine oil which requires the removal of an undershield. A minor point was that the rear tappet plate was made difficult to remove by having carburettor control springs anchored on it. The newspaper noted that a few drops of oil two or three times a week ensures tappets run for a long time without shake otherwise they soon become noisy.

The following good points were noted by The Times:

easy to reach magneto, dynamo, starter and carburettor
clutch spigot and the withdrawal mechanism automatically lubricated
all brakes have easy to reach hand adjustments
no grease-cups but spring-controlled ball-valve greasers throughout the chassis, special gun supplied
easy to reach tools, access does not disturb a passenger
fuel tank at the back has a gauge easy to read when the luggage grid is fully loaded
fuel tank fuel filter funnel
all-weather hood; the side-curtain beside the driver has access for a signalling arm

Accordingly, The Times also noted that "it is not necessary to lift floorboards and poke about with an oilcan before a journey".

The car was thought to be moderately fast, best run 50 miles per hour (80 km/h) but it seemed to have a minor fault and should have reached 55 miles per hour (89 km/h). Seating was assessed to be comfortable with unusually generous knee room in the front seat. Of 5-seater owner-driver cars that have been submitted to The Times for trial this car, said the reviewer, is the best. He did consider the car a little narrow for five passengers but decided there is sufficient legroom

On the road, he reported, the lively quiet and flexible engine was silky on top and accelerated with real spirit. Though the clutch could grab, the gears were easy and quiet. The car's steering was delightful but its brakes and suspension were only satisfactory.

== Fifteen 40 ==
Humber 15/40
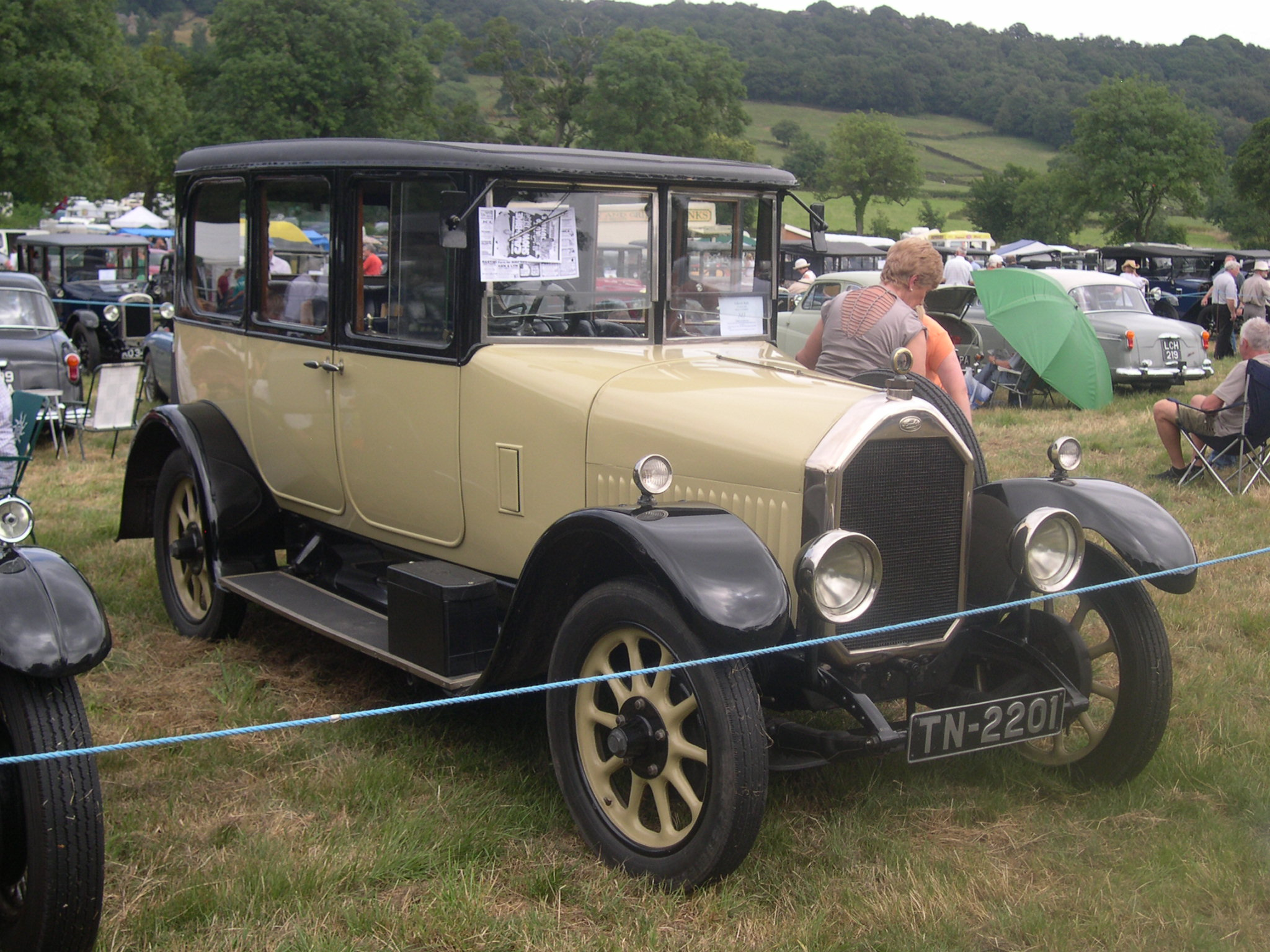
- saloon registered December 1927; Humber Mole with black trimmings

Overview
- Manufacturer: Humber Limited
- Production: 1924–1928

Body and chassis
- Body style: 5-seater open tourer (AllWeather); 4-door saloon; saloon landaulette with 2 occasional seats; chassis only also available
- Layout: FR

Powertrain
- Engine: 2815 cc Straight-4

Dimensions
- Wheelbase: 123.5 in (3,137 mm); Track 57 in (1,448 mm)
- Length: 173 in (4,394 mm)
- Width: 69 in (1,753 mm)
- Kerb weight: Saloon 31 cwt, 3,472 lb (1,575 kg)

Humber 15/40 engine

Overview
- Manufacturer: Humber Limited

Layout
- Configuration: Straight 4-cylinder
- Displacement: 2,815 cc (171.8 cu in)
- Cylinder bore: 80 mm (3.15 in)
- Piston stroke: 140 mm (5.51 in)

Output
- Power output: 40 bhp (30 kW; 41 PS) @not provided rpm; Tax horsepower 15.6

The 15-40-hp, a lightly revised 15.9, was displayed at the Olympia Motor Show in October 1924.

=== Engine ===
The Times noted some trouble had been taken to dampen engine vibration. The engine and separate gearbox were on a subframe. The engine was flexibly held by two sets of enclosed springs at the front end and at the back by semi-circular steel trunnion blocks. These blocks were secured by spring-loaded bolts. This way the engine was held firmly in a fore and aft position but could swing to the limits of the two sets of enclosed front springs.

=== Bodies ===
Each body now had four instead of three doors. The rear seats were wider incorporating the space above the wheel arches, the mudguards were built closer to the wheels to reduce mud splashing. The saloon landaulette's solo occasional seat was now a pair and they folded into the partition below the glass division.

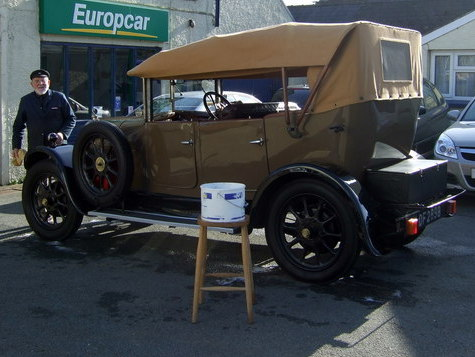
1926 tourer

The petrol filler was no longer beneath any luggage on the grid but out to the side.

All-weather equipment was better, The side screens in their stiff metal frames were glazed with celluloid as before but they were now part of the body, they folded within the lower half of the door. Each frame edge overlapped the next. Humber's advertising said: "Exclusive! Ready-In-a-Moment All-Weather-Windows and One-Man Hood."

=== Brakes, suspension ===
The 15-40-hp was fitted with Humber-Perrott semi-servo front wheel brakes. The driver's foot pedal still worked the transmission brake and now the front wheel brakes as well. A floating shoe gave the semi-servo effect and it relied to some extent on forward motion. Applying the brakes when backing the car received only half the force. Front axle and stub axles were strengthened to accommodate the higher loads from braking, to the same end the springs were wider and there was a new cross tube linking the dumb irons (forward ends of the main longitudinal chassis members). Front brake adjustment was carried out by jacking up that end of the car and the hand-operated nuts turned until equal pressure was provided to each wheel. The following year a compensating device was installed between the two sets of brakes.

Shock absorbers were now fitted to the front as well as to the back suspension.

=== Test ===
When the 15/40 was tested by The Times in August 1924 the report ended "travelling was a pleasure".
