= Vacuum brake =

Train braking system

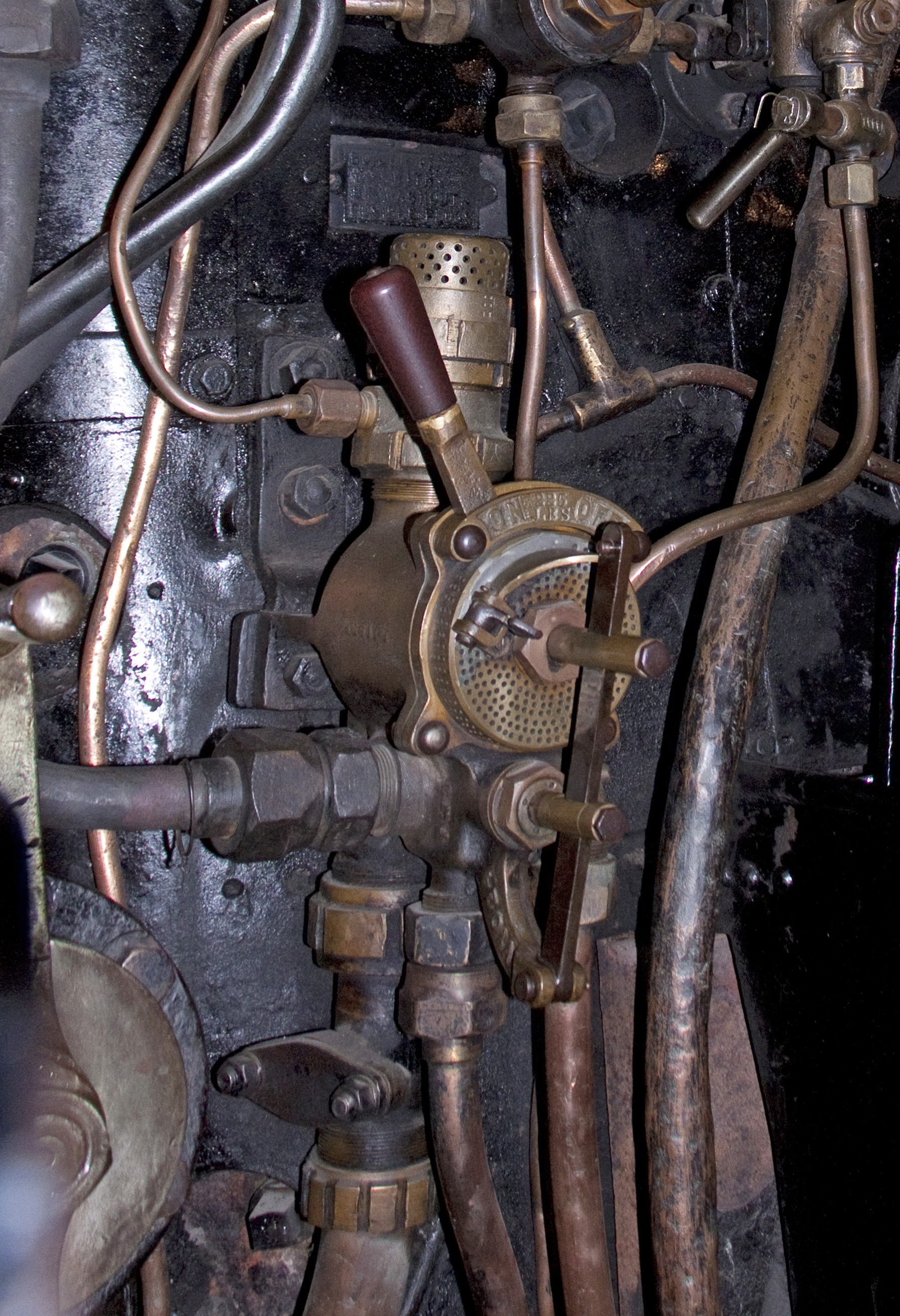
Driver's brake control in a Black 5

The vacuum brake is a braking system employed on trains and introduced in the mid-1860s. A variant, the automatic vacuum brake system, became almost universal in British train equipment and in countries influenced by British practice. Vacuum brakes also enjoyed a brief period of adoption in the United States, primarily on narrow-gauge railroads. Their limitations caused them to be progressively superseded by compressed air systems starting in the United Kingdom from the 1970s onward. The vacuum brake system is now obsolete; it is not in large-scale usage anywhere in the world, other than in South Africa, largely supplanted by air brakes.

== Introduction ==
In the earliest days of railways, trains were slowed or stopped by the application of manually applied brakes on the locomotive and in brake vehicles through the train, and later by steam power brakes on locomotives. This was clearly unsatisfactory, given the slow and unreliable response times (each brake being separately applied by a member of the train crew in response to signals from the driver, which they might miss for any number of reasons, and necessarily in sequence rather than all at once where there were more brakes than crew members, making emergency braking extremely hit-and-miss) and extremely limited braking power that could be exerted (most vehicles in the train being wholly unbraked, and the power of all but the locomotive's own brakes relying on the strength of a particular crewmember's arm on a screw handle), but the existing technology did not offer an improvement. A chain braking system was developed, requiring a chain to be coupled throughout the train, but it was impossible to arrange equal braking effort along the entire train.

A major advance was the adoption of a vacuum braking system, in which flexible pipes were connected between all the vehicles of the train, and brakes on each vehicle could be controlled from the locomotive. The earliest scheme was a simple vacuum brake, in which vacuum was created by operation of a valve on the locomotive; the vacuum actuated brake pistons on each vehicle, and the degree of braking could be increased or decreased by the driver. Vacuum, rather than compressed air, was preferred because steam locomotives can be fitted with ejectors; venturi devices that create vacuum without moving parts.

The simple vacuum system had the major defect that in the event of one of the hoses connecting the vehicles becoming displaced (by the train accidentally dividing, or by careless coupling of the hoses, or otherwise) the vacuum brake on the entire train was useless.

In response to this obvious defect, the automatic vacuum brake was subsequently developed. It was designed to apply fully if the train became divided or if a hose became displaced. The automatic vacuum brake was slightly more expensive to manufacture and install than the simple system due to it requiring a higher number of machined parts, and incurred higher running costs since the ejector ran continuously (at a cost in steam and thus fuel and water) to maintain the vacuum when the train was running, rather than only being used when braking as in the simple system.

Opposition to the fitting of the automatic type of brake on the grounds of cost (particularly by the LNWR and its chairman Richard Moon - as one of the largest British companies, the refusal of the LNWR to adopt the automatic brake was a strong factor against its wider use by other companies, especially those interchanging traffic with the North Western) meant that it took a serious accident at Armagh in 1889 before legislation compelled the adoption of the automatic system. In this accident at Armagh, a portion of a train was detached from the locomotive on a steep gradient and ran away, killing 80 people. The train was fitted with the simple vacuum brake, which was useless on the disconnected portion of the train. It was clear that if the vehicles had been fitted with an automatic continuous brake, the accident would almost certainly not have happened, and the public concern at the scale of the accident prompted legislation mandating the use of a continuous automatic brake on all passenger trains.

In continental Europe, the vacuum brake was sometimes called the Hardy brake, after John George Hardy of the Vacuum Brake Co, 7 Hohenstaufengasse, Vienna.

== Operation ==
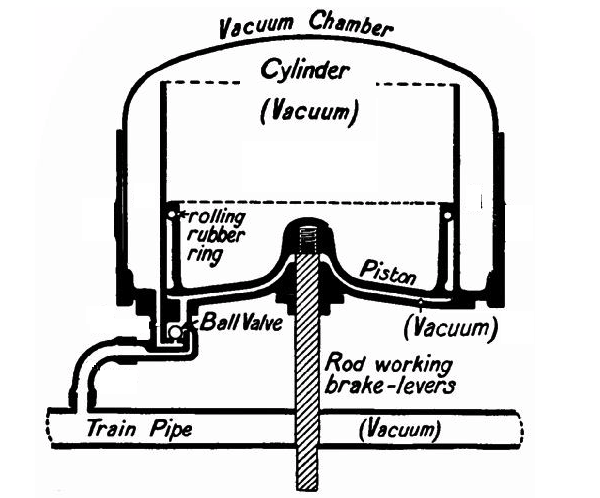
Vacuum brake cylinder in running position: the vacuum is the same above and below the piston

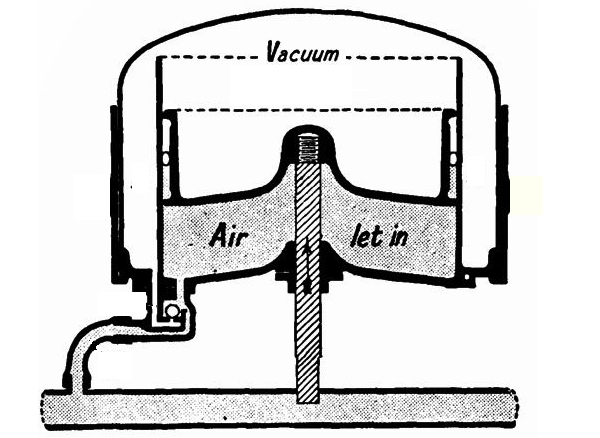
Air at atmospheric pressure from the train pipe is admitted below the piston, which is forced up

In its simplest form, the automatic vacuum brake consists of a continuous pipe—the train pipe—running throughout the length of the train. In normal running a partial vacuum is maintained in the train pipe, and the brakes are released. When air is admitted to the train pipe, the air at atmospheric pressure acts against pistons in cylinders in each vehicle. A vacuum is sustained on the other face of the pistons, so that a net force is applied. A mechanical linkage transmits this force to brake shoes which act on the treads of the wheels.

The fittings to achieve this are:

- a train pipe: a steel pipe running the length of each vehicle, with flexible vacuum hoses at each end of the vehicles, and coupled between adjacent vehicles; at the end of the train, the final hose is seated on an air-tight plug;
- an ejector on the locomotive, to create vacuum in the train pipe;
- controls for the driver to bring the ejector into action, and to admit air to the train pipe; these may be separate controls or a combined brake valve;
- a brake cylinder on each vehicle containing a piston, connected by rigging to the brake shoes on the vehicle; and
- a vacuum (pressure) gauge on the locomotive to indicate to the driver the degree of vacuum in the train pipe.

The brake cylinder is contained in a larger housing—this gives a reserve of vacuum as the piston operates. The cylinder rocks slightly in operation to maintain alignment with the brake rigging cranks, so it is supported in trunnion bearings, and the vacuum pipe connection to it is flexible. The piston in the brake cylinder has a flexible piston ring that allows air to pass from the upper part of the cylinder to the lower part if necessary.

When the vehicles have been at rest, so that the brake is not charged, the brake pistons will have dropped to their lower position in the absence of a pressure differential (as air will have leaked slowly into the upper part of the cylinder, destroying the vacuum).

When a locomotive is coupled to the vehicles, the driver moves the brake control to the "release" position and air is exhausted from the train pipe, creating a partial vacuum. Air in the upper part of the brake cylinders is also exhausted from the train pipe, through a non-return ball valve.

If the driver now moves his control to the "brake" position, air is admitted to the train pipe. According to the driver's manipulation of the control, some or all of the vacuum will be destroyed in the process. The ball valve closes and there is a higher air pressure under the brake pistons than above it, and the pressure differential forces the piston upwards, applying the brakes. The driver can control the amount of braking effort by admitting more or less air to the train pipe.

== Practical considerations ==
The automatic vacuum brake as described represented a considerable technical advance in train braking. In practice steam locomotives had two ejectors, a small ejector for running purposes (to maintain the partial vacuum at the correct level against inevitable slight air leaks in the train pipe and its connections) and a large ejector to release brake applications. The small ejector used much less steam than the large ejector but could not generate vacuum in the train pipe sufficiently quickly for operational purposes, especially in a long train. Later Great Western Railway practice was to use a vacuum pump instead of the small ejector – the pump was fitted to one of the engine crossheads and so did not use any steam, with the disadvantage that it only operated when the locomotive was in motion. The GWR favoured this due to the use of braking systems working on a vacuum level higher than other railways (see below) which would have required a relatively large and steam-hungry "small" ejector.

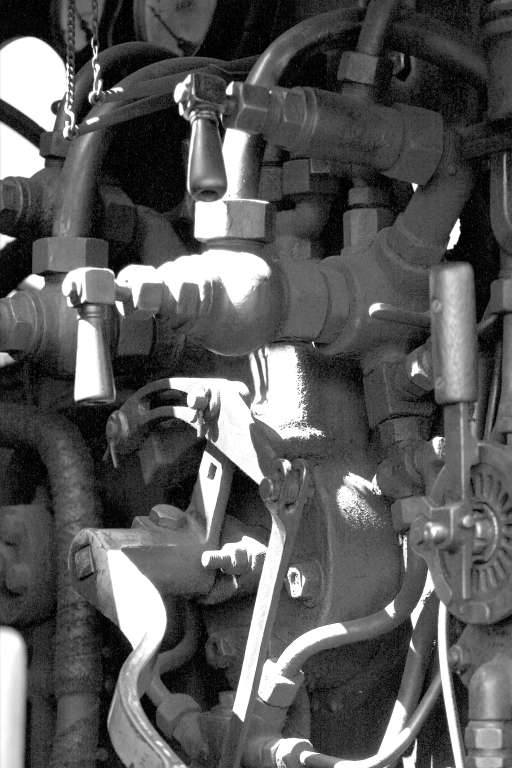
Graduable brake valve (right) and the small (upper) and large ejector cocks from a GWR locomotive

Most steam locomotives of the period used straightforward live steam brakes on their own wheels (where steam pressure was let into the brake cylinders to apply the brakes), with the vacuum brake being solely used on the train. In such a case the two systems were usually operated proportionately by a single control, whereby the reduction in vacuum in the train brake system would open the valve feeding steam to the engine brake. It was unusual for any form of dedicated control to be provided solely for the steam brake – even when running with no train the driver controlled the engine's steam brakes by adjusting the vacuum brake system using the ejectors on the engine and the "head end" of the train pipe. This allowed the driver of the lead engine direct control over the brakes on any trailing locomotive (as well as the train itself) when double heading.

With the introduction of diesel and electric locomotives by British Railways from the early 1950s, this same basic arrangement was carried over. BR's Modernisation Plan of 1955 called for, amongst other things, a long-term aim to switch to air brakes for both passenger and freight stock. The standard Mark 1 coaching stock had been designed and procured before the decision to switch to modern traction and air brakes had been taken, so the majority of the stock was fitted with traditional vacuum brakes. Air-braked goods wagons were introduced steadily from the mid-1960s (starting with the HAA-type hoppers for the new 'merry-go-round trains' trains) and the Mark 2a coaching stock with air brakes was built from 1967. Diesel and electric locomotives naturally could not use the traditional steam-driven ejector to generate vacuum. Smaller locomotives had exhausters or vacuum pumps driven directly by their prime mover while larger ones had similar machines mounted separately and driven by dedicated electric motors. It was normal practice on mainline locomotives to fit two exhausters (and two air compressors for the air brake system) for redundancy. Just as steam locomotives had a small and large ejector, the diesels and electrics (most of which had braking equipment supplied by either British Westinghouse or Davies and Metcalfe) had their brake controls set up to run one exhauster continuously to generate and maintain the vacuum in the system (analogous to the small ejector), with the second one being started when the brake handle was set to its 'Release' position to provide a quicker response (the same function as the large ejector). A switch in the locomotive cab allowed the driver to choose which exhauster would serve each function.

Release valves are provided on the brake cylinders; when operated, usually by manually pulling a cord near the cylinder, air is admitted to the upper part of the brake cylinder on that vehicle. This is necessary to release the brake on a vehicle that has been uncoupled from a train and now requires to be moved without having a brake connection to another locomotive, for example if it is to be shunted.

In the UK the pre-nationalisation railway companies standardised around systems operating on a vacuum of 21 inches of mercury (533.4 Torr; 71.1 kPa; 10.3 psi), with the exception of the Great Western Railway, which used 25 inHg (635.0 Torr; 84.7 kPa; 12.3 psi). Sea level air pressure is about 30 inHg (762.0 Torr; 101.6 kPa; 14.7 psi), depending on atmospheric conditions.

This difference in standards could cause problems on long-distance cross-country services when a GWR locomotive was replaced with another company's engine, as the new engine's large ejector would sometimes not be able to fully release the brakes on the train. In this case the release valves on each vehicle in the train would have to be released by hand, before the brake was recharged at 21 inches. This time-consuming process was frequently seen at large GWR stations such as Bristol Temple Meads.

The provision of a train pipe running throughout the train enabled the automatic vacuum brake to be operated in emergency from any position in the train. Every guard's compartment had a brake valve, and the passenger communication apparatus (usually called "the communication cord" in lay terminology) also admitted air into the train pipe at the end of coaches so equipped.

When a locomotive is first coupled to a train, or if a vehicle is detached or added, a brake continuity test is carried out, to ensure that the brake pipes are connected throughout the entire length of the train.

== Limitations ==
The progress represented by the automatic vacuum brake nonetheless carried some limitations; chief among these were:

- the practical limit on the degree of vacuum attainable means that a very large brake piston and cylinder are required to generate the force necessary on the brake blocks; when a proportion of the British ordinary wagon fleet was fitted with vacuum brakes in the 1950s, the physical dimensions of the brake cylinder prevented the wagons from operating in some private sidings that had tight clearances;
- for the same reason, on a very long train, a considerable volume of air has to be admitted to the train pipe to make a full brake application, and a considerable volume has to be exhausted to release the brake (if for example a signal at danger is suddenly cleared and the driver requires to resume speed); while the air is traveling along the train pipe, the brake pistons at the head of the train have responded to the brake application or release, but those at the tail will respond much later, leading to undesirable longitudinal forces in the train. In extreme cases this has led to breaking couplings and causing the train to divide.
- the existence of vacuum in the train pipe can cause debris to be sucked in. An accident took place near Ilford in the 1950s, due to inadequate braking effort in the train. A rolled newspaper was discovered in the train pipe, effectively isolating the rear part of the train from the driver's control. The blockage should have been detected if a proper brake continuity test had been carried out before the train started its journey.

A development introduced in the 1950s was the direct admission valve, fitted to every brake cylinder. These valves responded to a rise in train pipe pressure as the brake was applied, and admitted atmospheric air directly to the underside of the brake cylinder.

American and continental European practice had long favoured compressed air brake systems, the leading pattern being a proprietary Westinghouse system. This has a number of advantages, including smaller brake cylinders (because higher air pressure could be used) and a somewhat more responsive braking effort. However, the system requires an air pump. On steam engines this was usually a reciprocating steam-driven compressor, which was quite bulky and much more complicated and maintenance-intensive than the vacuum ejector, which was compact and had no moving parts. The compressor's distinctive shape and the characteristic puffing sound when the brake is released (as the train pipe has to be recharged with air) make steam locomotives fitted with the Westinghouse brake unmistakable. Another disadvantage of the earlier air brake systems (although later overcome) was that it was impossible to make a partial release. The vacuum brake can very simply be partially released by restoring some (but not all) of the vacuum, without having to fully release the brakes. The original air brake systems, on the other hand, did not allow this, the only way of partially releasing the brake being to fully release it, then re-apply it to the desired setting.

A corollary of this was that the standard vacuum brake system, as used between the 1860s and the 1940s, could not easily maintain a constant level of application. The driver could remove air from the train pipe using the ejector(s) or admit air using the brake valve but there was no way of setting the brake to a fixed level of vacuum between 'zero' (atmospheric pressure) and the maximum vacuum-generating capabilities of the ejector (21–25 inHg (71–85 kPa), see above). The only way to do so was to carefully balance the setting of the brake valve and the small ejector, which was difficult to achieve in practice and was not even possible on some systems which combined both into a single control. This meant that braking occurred through a series of controlled applications and releases – perfectly adequate to safely bring a train to a halt but requiring constant management to maintain a speed on a downhill gradient. By contrast even the earliest Westinghouse air brake systems could be 'lapped' – the system would maintain the brakes at a constant level as set by the driver. Later vacuum brake systems as fitted to British Railways diesel and electric locomotives and multiple units in the 1950s used mechanically driven exhausters or vacuum pumps which included regulator valves allowing the driver to set a desired vacuum in the train pipe which would then be maintained by the system admitted or exhausting air as required.

In the UK, the Great Eastern Railway, the North Eastern Railway, the London, Chatham and Dover Railway, the London Brighton and South Coast Railway and the Caledonian Railway adopted the Westinghouse compressed air system. It was also standard on the Isle of Wight rail system. This led to compatibility problems in exchanging traffic with other lines. It was possible to provide through pipes for the braking system not fitted to any particular vehicle so that it could run in a train using the "other" system, allowing through control of the fitted vehicles behind it, but with no braking effort of its own; or to fit vehicles with both braking systems. The Big Four companies formed in 1923 all chose to adopt the vacuum brake as the new standard for most rolling stock, with the same 21 inHg (71 kPa) operating vacuum with the continuing exception of the GWR (and many electric multiple units introduced in this period used variations on the automatic air brake). A large proportion of the inherited air-braked stock had been retired or converted to vacuum operation by the outbreak of the Second World War and with the formation of British Railways in 1948 the 21 inHg vacuum brake system became the new standard. However, air-braked steam-hauled stock remained in service on the former Great Eastern Railway suburban lines from London Liverpool Street until the end of steam on the GE in 1962.

== Producing the vacuum ==
=== Ejectors ===
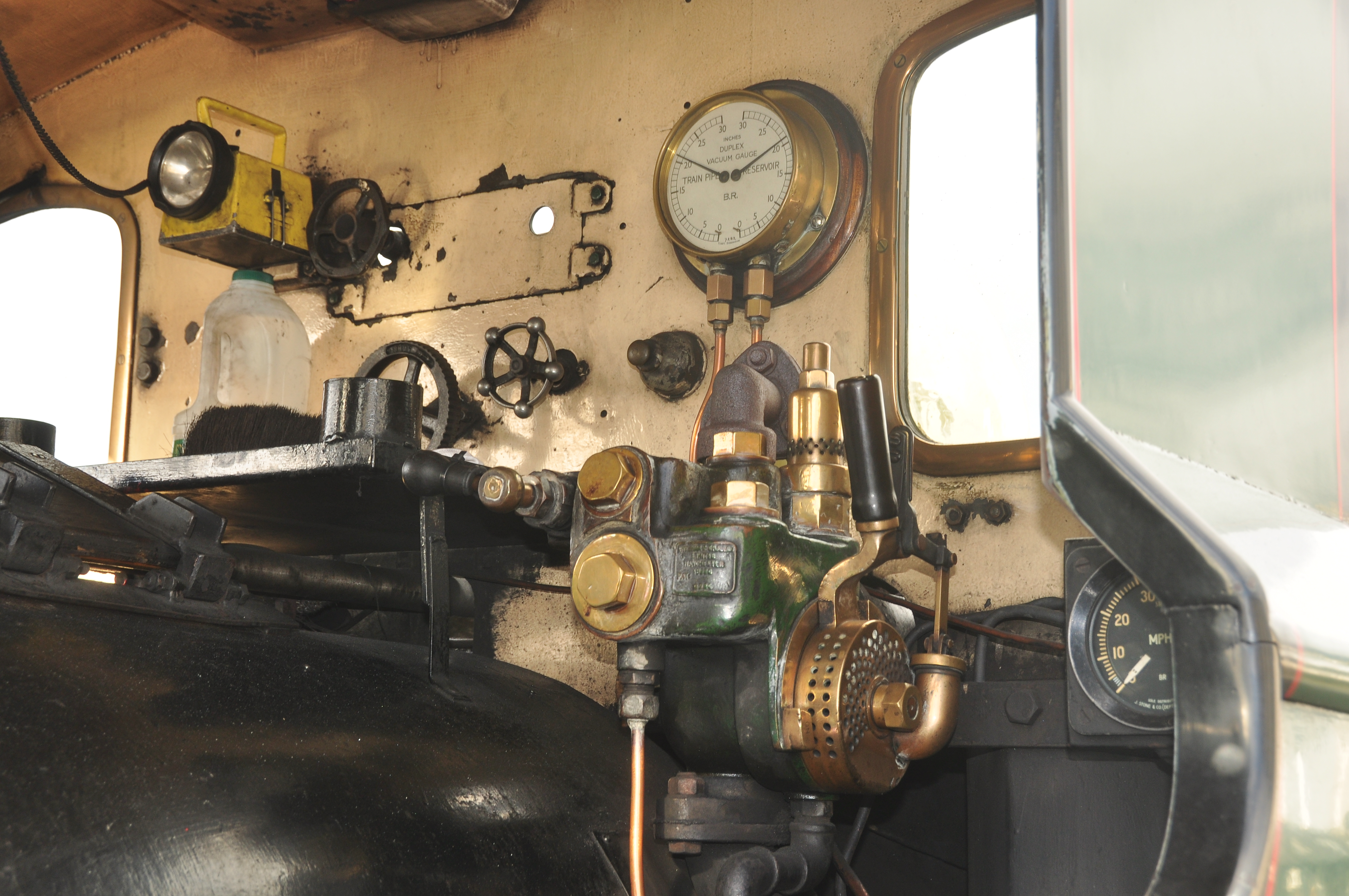
Driver's brake control on a combined control and ejector. The ejector steam nozzles, large and small, are beneath the hexagonal brass plugs on the left.

Vacuum brakes were initially favoured over air brakes because of the ease of producing the vacuum. A vacuum ejector was a simpler and more reliable device, compared to the reciprocating pump.

Typically two ejectors are fitted, large and small. The large ejector is used to 'blow off' the brakes, by producing the vacuum, and is then shut off. The small ejector is left running continuously in order to maintain it. The Gresham & Craven 'Dreadnought' ejector was a combination ejector, with both large and small ejectors within the same body. The vacuum produced depended on the total number of vehicles in the train and the sum of their various minor leaks. A train of stock due for maintenance could make it difficult to maintain a vacuum, even requiring intermittent use of the large ejector when running. The widely used Super-Dreadnought ejector combined a large ejector with two small ejectors in one. If needed, two of the smaller nozzles could produce more vacuum, yet were more efficient in their use of steam then a single larger nozzle.

The Great Western Railway was noted for its idiosyncrasies, including the use of a higher brake vacuum than other lines. To maintain this without excessive steam consumption in an ejector, they also favoured the use of a crosshead-driven mechanical pump.

=== Exhausters ===
Diesel locomotives were introduced at a time when vacuum brakes were still widespread. Ejectors are not practical and so mechanical pumps or 'exhausters' are used instead. These are a small rotary vane pump, similar to some forms of vacuum pump. The body is a cylindrical metal casting with a cylindrical rotor within it, but the two axes are offset. The rotor contains a number of sliding vanes, typically six. As the rotor is rotated, the vanes are held against the walls of the cylindrical body. Entry and exit ports at the top and bottom of the cylinder, where the rotor is furthest from and nearest to the wall, provide a vacuum pumping effect. (Note: The exit is at the bottom, so that it carries the draining lubricating oil away with it.) The vanes are held against the cylinder by an internal cam ring (Note: See Powerplus supercharger for a similar vane pump with positive control of the vane position.) or by springs. They are lubricated by an oil feed into the exhauster. As the exhauster is oil-lubricated, the exhaust air is full of oil droplets and so passes through an oil separator before being exhausted to the atmosphere. A simple check valve on the inlet prevents backflow leakage, if the exhauster stops.

Compared to the compressor of an air brake, the exhauster is a simpler and more reliable device. It has no valves, so fewer moving parts. There is no pressure control, as vacuum pumping is self-limiting. The exhauster runs cooler as there is little compression of the pumped air. The pump seals are simpler, owing to the lower pressure, and there are no piston rings with a risk of sticking.

Exhausters are typically engine-driven, and run continuously. If there are two engines in a locomotive or railcar, two exhausters are usually fitted. They are cheap devices, extra pumping capacity can help to release the brakes more quickly and their redundancy reduces the risk of a failure causing a failed train. On electric locomotives, the exhausters are electrically driven.

Some of the first diesel-engined buses and coaches between the 1930s and 1950s also used engine-driven exhausters. They were designed with vacuum braking systems or servo-assisted brakes, based on earlier models with petrol engines. As petrol engines produce a manifold vacuum, (Note: This works similarly to a vacuum ejector.) vacuum systems are easily added. Diesel engines have no throttle or manifold venturi, thus do not provide a usable vacuum source. Trucks and later buses used compressor-driven air brakes instead.

== Dual brakes ==
Vehicles can be fitted with dual brakes, vacuum and air, provided that there is room to fit the duplicated equipment. In a dual fitted vehicle, there would be both a vacuum cylinder and one or more air brake cylinders, all operating on the same set of rigging to apply the brakes at the vehicle wheels. Some of BR's Mk1 coaches were built with dual brakes (all had vacuum as standard) and much of the rest of the fleet was dual fitted by the 1980s, so they could be worked by air or vacuum fitted locomotives as the changeover from vacuum to air took place between 1970 and the early 1990s.

On a smaller vehicle such as a traditional four-wheeled goods wagon, it is much easier to fit just one kind of brake with a pipe for continuity of the other. Train crew need to take note that the wrong-fitted wagons do not contribute to the braking effort and make allowances on down grades to suit. Many of the earlier classes of diesel locomotive used on British Railways (and electric locos up to and including the Class 86) were fitted with dual systems to enable full usage of BR's rolling stock inherited from the private companies which had different systems depending on which company the stock originated from.

Air brakes need a tap to seal the hose at the ends of the train. If these taps are incorrectly closed, a loss of brake force may occur, leading to a dangerous runaway. With vacuum brakes, the end of the hose can be plugged into a stopper which seals the hose by suction. It is much harder to block the hose pipe compared to air brakes.

== Twin pipe systems ==
Vacuum brakes can be operated in a twin pipe mode to speed up applications and release. Twin pipe vacuum systems were standard on the first generation British Rail Diesel Multiple Units which replaced steam locomotive hauled passenger trains on many branch and secondary lines in the 1960s. The second "high Vacuum " pipe and associated reservoirs and valves were used as a means to increase the speed of the release of the brake. The vacuum exhausters on these units were mechanically driven by the engine; as the engine would normally only be idling when a brake release was required, release would have been extremely slow if the conventional single-pipe system had been employed. This problem did not occur on BR's diesel locomotives, as their exhausters were electrically driven, and so could be run at high speed to release the brake irrespective of engine speed.

== Present-day use of vacuum brakes ==
Today's largest operators of trains equipped with vacuum brakes are the Indian Railways and Transnet Freight Rail (South Africa), however there are also trains with air brakes and dual brakes in use. South African Railways (Spoornet) operates more than 1 000 electric multiple unit cars, which are fitted with air compressed brakes. The electro-vacuum system uses a 2-inch (51 mm) train pipe and basic automatic vacuum brake system, with the addition of electrically controlled application and release valves in each vehicle. The application and release valves greatly increase the rate of train pipe vacuum destruction and creation. This, in turn, greatly increases the speed of brake application and release. The performance of electro-vacuum brakes on SAR EMUs is equivalent to electro-pneumatic braked EMUs of a similar age.

Other African railways are believed to continue to use the vacuum brake. Other operators of vacuum brakes are narrow-gauge railways in Europe, the largest of which is the Rhaetian Railway.

Vacuum brakes have been entirely superseded on the Network Rail system in the UK (with the British Rail Class 121s being the last mainline trains to have vacuum brakes having been withdrawn in 2017), although they are still in use on most standard gauge heritage railways. They are also to be found on a diminishing number of main line vintage special trains.

Iarnród Éireann (the national rail operator in the Republic of Ireland) ran vacuum-braked British Railways Mark 2 stock on passenger trains until the end of March 2008 and still operates vacuum-braked revenue freight (at least in the case of Tara Mines ore traffic). All mainline heritage trains are run with vacuum brakes – the whole of Iarnród Éireann's current locomotive fleet has both air and vacuum train brakes fitted.

The Isle of Man Railway uses vacuum brakes fitted to all its coaching and wagon stock, as do the Ffestiniog and Welsh Highland Railways. Most other British narrow gauge lines use the air brake: this is because these railways were not required to fit continuous braking until the last quarter of the 20th century, by which time vacuum brake equipment was no longer being produced and was difficult to obtain.

== High altitude ==
Vacuum brakes are less effective at high altitude. This is because they depend upon the creation of a pressure differential; atmospheric pressure is lower at high altitudes, and so the maximum differential is also lower.

== See also ==
- Railway brake
- Gladhand connector
- Eames Vacuum Brake
- Railway air brake
- New York Air Brake
