= Powerplus supercharger =

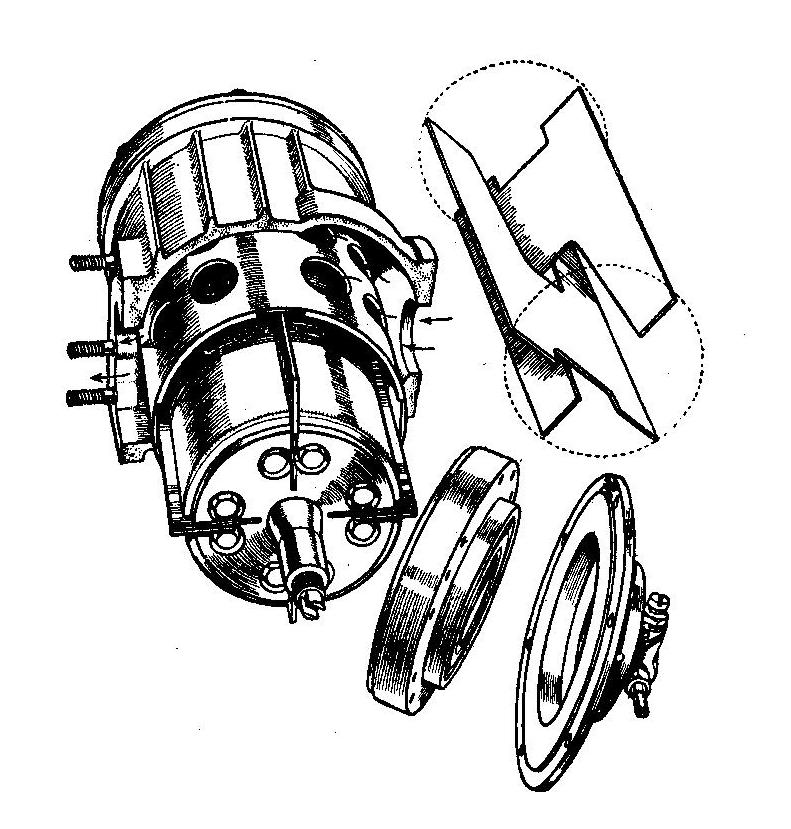

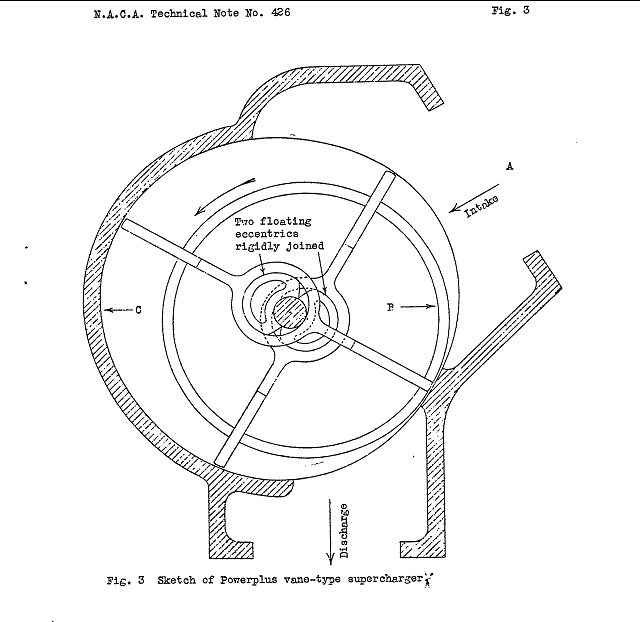
Cross-section (from)

The Powerplus is a design of supercharger that was used to boost the performance of car engines in the 1930s. It is a mechanically driven positive displacement pump, operating on the sliding-vane principle.

== MG cars ==
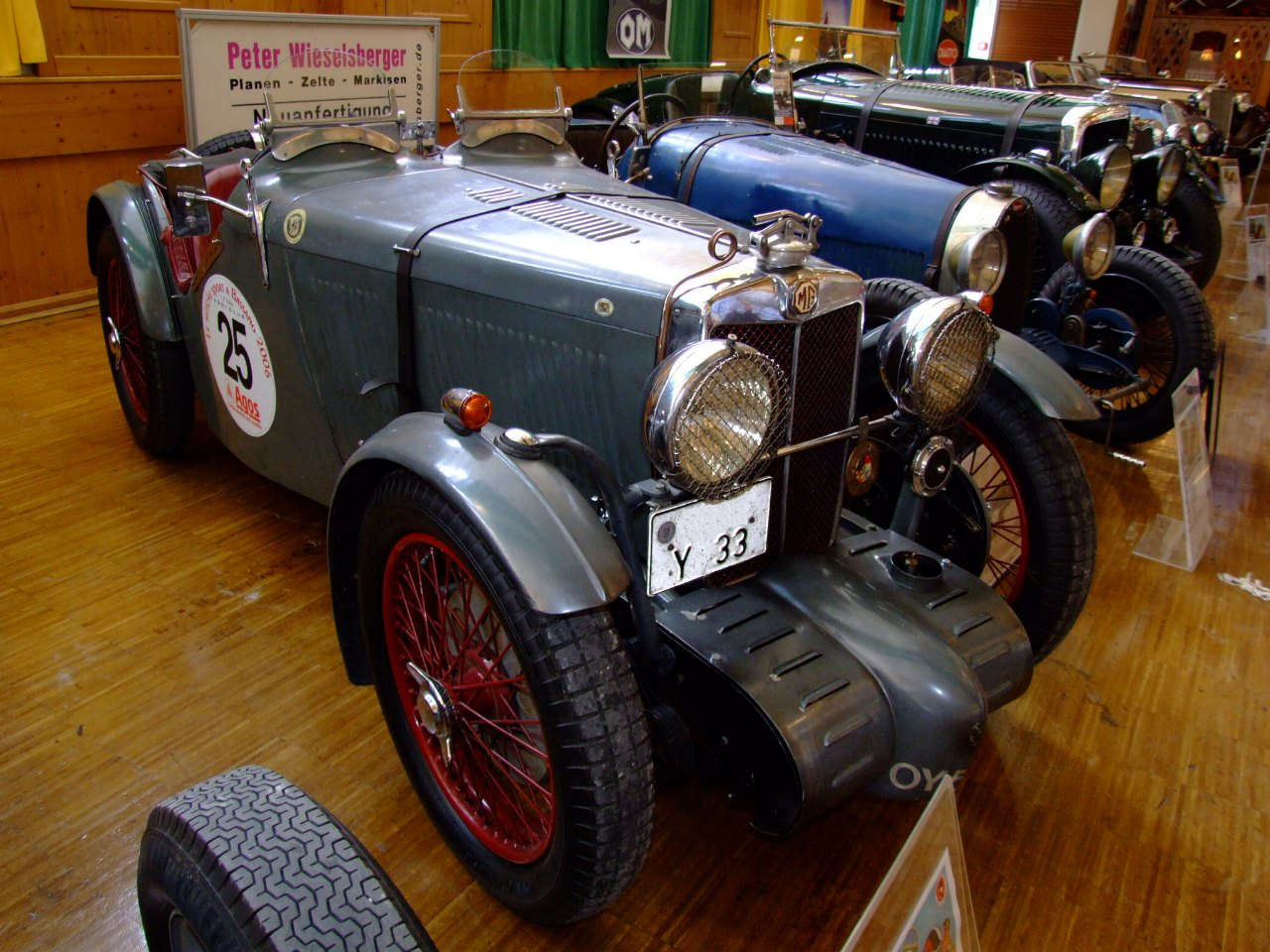
MG J4

Powerplus is best known through its use on some MG cars of the 1930s. MG specialised in small, lightweight "Midget" cars. Use of supercharging allowed engines of under 750 cc, 850 cc or 1,100 cc to generate competitive amounts of power, whilst still remaining in these small-engine classes.

The Powerplus design was the invention of Captain George Eyston, the land speed record holder. Supercharging first appeared on production MGs with the C type or Montlhéry Midget, inspired by Eyston's EX120 record-breaker of 1930 – the first 750 cc car to break 100 mph.

In the 750 cc class, the 746 cc J3 and the rare (only nine were built) pure-racing J4 of 1932 used the Powerplus. All of MG's superchargers were mounted ahead of and roughly in-line with the crankshaft, between the chassis dumb irons. The valance here was given a central bulge, capped with MG's octagon badge. The carburettor was a single large SU, mounted upstream of the blower for suck-through operation.

Perhaps the most famous of all supercharged MGs was the 1,087 cc K3 Magnette. Eyston was also a noted racer of MGs, particularly his K3 Magnette in the 1933 Isle of Man and 1934 Northern Ireland Tourist Trophy races and the Mille Miglia (both reprinted in) Although these were not intended as everyday road cars, MG set out to produce competitive 'clubman's' racing cars at an affordable production-line price. In 1934 a K3 Magnette with racing bodywork and a pre-selector gearbox cost £795, around twice the price of the Magnette saloons.

== Patents ==
- Improvements in and connected with rotary pump machines, (1929).

Eyston also held many other patents related to similar pumps.

== Comparison to sliding vane ==
The innovation of the Powerplus was to take the sliding-vane design and to address its main drawbacks. Although the simple sliding-vane design is straightforward to manufacture, having simply shaped component parts, the spring-loaded vanes rub on the housing and this friction requires lubrication. In the 1920s, it was common for supercharged cars to have large consumable oil tanks mounted alongside the supercharger. Their HC exhaust emissions are not recorded.

By adding a set of eccentrics and guide slots to the axle of the supercharger, the Powerplus actively controls the position of these vanes, such that they maintain a constant small clearance from the walls of the housing. This is enough spacing to avoid friction, but close enough to keep pumping efficient.

== Comparison to Roots ==
The obvious advantage of the Powerplus over the Roots was eliminating the need to machine complex-shaped rotors. With the manufacturing technology of 1930, this was a serious consideration. Eyston himself already held patents related to these manufacturing difficulties.

The problem with Powerplus was firstly its complexity. Although each component was of simple form, there was some number of them, including a separate Bosch oil pump. This reduced reliability, compared to the simplicity of a Roots (once manufactured).

Secondly, studies by NACA revealed that the Powerplus was less efficient than the Roots, i.e., more power was required to drive it. This was most pronounced at low-pressure differences. Where out-and-out performance was crucial, the Powerplus was competitive. However it was not likely to be preferred where efficiency or reduced fuel consumption were the deciding factors.

== See also ==
- Rotary vane pump
- Sarich orbital engine
