= A. T. Goldie Gardner =

British racing driver (1890–1958)

Goldie Gardner
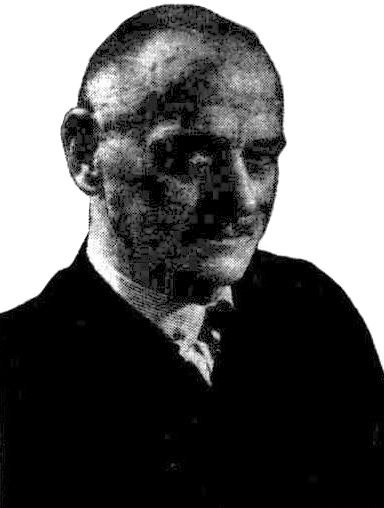
- Born: Alfred Thomas Goldie Gardner; 31 May 1890; Woodford Green, Essex, England
- Died: 25 August 1958 (aged 68); Eastbourne, Sussex, England
- Occupations: Racing Driver and Soldier

Lieutenant-Colonel Alfred Thomas Goldie Gardner OBE MC (31 May 1890 – 25 August 1958) was an English racing car driver who was the most prolific speed-record driver ever. He achieved nearly 150 national and international speed records, and at one point held six of the ten speed record category titles. According to the FIA, three of his records still stand today. Gardner was awarded the Segrave Trophy in 1938 and was a recipient of the BRDC Gold Star. In 1939, he was the first person to exceed 200 mph in a light car.

== Early life ==
Alfred Thomas Goldie Gardner was born in Woodford Green, Essex, on 31 May 1890. 'Goldie' was his mother's family name and retained in the Scottish tradition, but he was known by this name as a child and later by close friends. Gardner was educated at Pelham House, School, Sandgate, Kent. and Uppingham School where he excelled at sports. After working briefly at Lloyd's of London and service in the Honourable Artillery Company, in 1910 he took a contract as a colonial broker in Ceylon, where he also served in the Ceylon Mounted Rifles. Upon completion of his Ceylon contract he gained a new appointment in Katha, Burma, but it was cut short by a bad attack of typhoid fever with malaria and he was sent back to England on six months' sick leave.

== First world war ==
During his convalescence in 1914, the First World War started. He enlisted in September of that year and was granted a commission in the Royal Field Artillery as a second lieutenant, and was quickly placed in command of B Battery, 72nd Brigade RFA. Gardner had a distinguished military career, being personally Mentioned in Dispatches by Field Marshal Sir John French in 1915 and awarded the Military Cross for bravery in January 1917. In August 1917, he suffered severe injuries to his right hip and leg in an aircraft accident. Despite a long period of recovery, he never regained full use of his leg and walked with a stick for the rest of his life. He was discharged from the army in 1921 as medically unfit for further service.

== Motorsport ==
In 1924 he purchased a Gordon England special Austin Seven and despite his disability began racing regularly at Brooklands Motor Circuit. After racing in various different cars, in 1931 he purchased one of the first MG C-Type Midgets, starting an association MG Cars that lasted until his death. and he raced various of these marks with considerable success. He suffered a crash during the 1932 RAC Tourist Trophy race at Ards in Northern Ireland that further worsened the disability to his already damaged leg. By 1934 he was fit enough to continue track racing and in the 500 mile race at Brooklands with co-driver Dr.J.D.Benjafield he achieved third place as well as winning the 1,100cc class.

After accompanying Sir Malcolm Campbell's expedition to Daytona Beach, Florida, in 1935 as team manager for Campbell's World Land speed record attempt, he returned to England and concentrated on speed racing records. Initially using an offset single-seat MG K3 (K3007) he set the 1100cc outer lap record at Brooklands in 1936 before travelling to Frankfurt in Germany and Montlhery in France in 1937 where he set a host of 1100cc (Class G) international records. Public acclaim persuaded the Nuffield Group to provide financial support, enabling the modification of another MG K3, EX135 which was given a streamlined body by Reid Railton. On 31 May 1939, driving EX135 at Dessau, Germany, on the Dessauer Rennstrecke, now Bundesautobahn 9, Goldie Gardner took the 750cc up to 1,100cc class records over 2 kilometres, 1 mile, and 5 kilometres distances, at average speeds of 203.5 mph, 203.3 mph and 197.5 mph respectively. After an overnight engine rebore, on 2 June 1939 at the same venue he gained the 1,100cc to 1,500cc class records over the same distances at average speeds of 204.3 mph, 203.9 mph and 200.6 mph. This was an extraordinary achievement as his top speed one way was 207.4 mph, faster than Sir Henry Segrave had achieved with the 45-litre Sunbeam just twelve years previously to break the Land Speed Record.

== Second World War ==
In 1939, alongside his old friend Sir Malcolm Campbell, Gardner was part of the Coats Mission, a secret plan to evacuate the Royal Family from London in the event of a German invasion. A few months later, he reenlisted as an officer in the Royal Artillery and quickly regained his rank of Major. He was posted to Scarborough, then Rhyll in North Wales, specialising in Mechanical Transport training. In 1944, he was promoted to lieutenant colonel and posted to 21 Army Group HQ, acting as a Civil Affairs officer in General Montgomery's headquarters during D-Day, a job he continued until the end of the war.

== Postwar record breaking ==
In October 1946, Gardner was the first person to use the road at Jabbeke in Belgium for speed records, setting new Class H records of over 159 mph and establishing the Jabbekke as the main post-war European speed record location.

=== 1948 Jaguar XJ/XK Engine 'Gardner Jaguar Special' ===
In September 1948, after a falling out with MG, Gardner linked up with Jaguar Cars who agreed to support him for another run in Jabbeke. Jaguar engineers Wally Hassan and Lofty England travelled with him to Belgium and fitted the experimental 4-cylinder KJ engine (later developed into the 6-cylinder XK). He broke the flying mile, kilometre and five-kilometre Class E records The new records were: mile 173.678 mph, kilometre 177.112 mph and five kilometres 170.523 mph.

=== Bonneville Salt Flats, 1951 and 1952 ===
In 1951 and 1952, with renewed support from the MG Car Company, Gardner took EX135 to Bonneville Salt Flats, Utah, setting a total of 43 short- and long-distance speed records. During the 1952 attempt, wet salt caused him to skid and he struck a wooden marker post which struck him on the head.

=== Illness and death ===
The head injury he suffered in 1952 caused a subarachnoid haemorrhage which led to his collapse in 1953. Over the next few years, his health deteriorated until his death in August 1958. He is buried at Ocklynge Cemetery in Eastbourne.

== Family life ==
On 10 March 1936 he married Mary Eleanor King Boalt in Daytona Beach, Florida, United States. She was an heir to the J.R. Watkins company in Winona, MN. They had divorced by 1940.

In 1940 he married Una Eagle-Clarke (1914–2008). They had one daughter Rosalind,

== Awards and honours ==
1915: Mentioned in Despatches 1917: Military Cross 1938: Segrave Trophy 1938, 1947, 1949: British Racing Drivers' Club Gold Star
