= George Eyston =

British racing driver and speed record holder (1897–1979)

Captain George E.T. Eyston
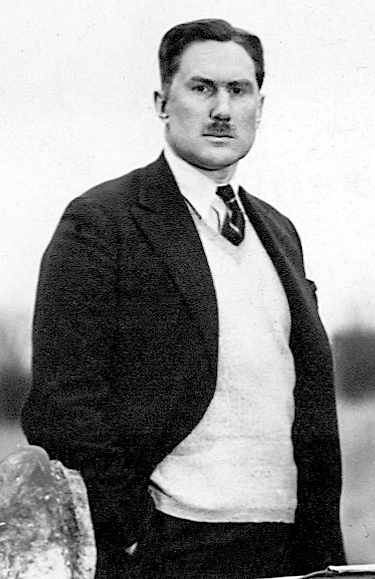
- George Eyston in 1931
- Born: 28 June 1897; Bampton, Oxfordshire, England
- Died: 11 June 1979 (aged 81); Lambeth, London, England
- Occupations: Engineer, inventor, racing driver
- Awards: Military Cross, (1917); Segrave Trophy, (1935); Légion d'honneur, (1938); OBE, (1948)

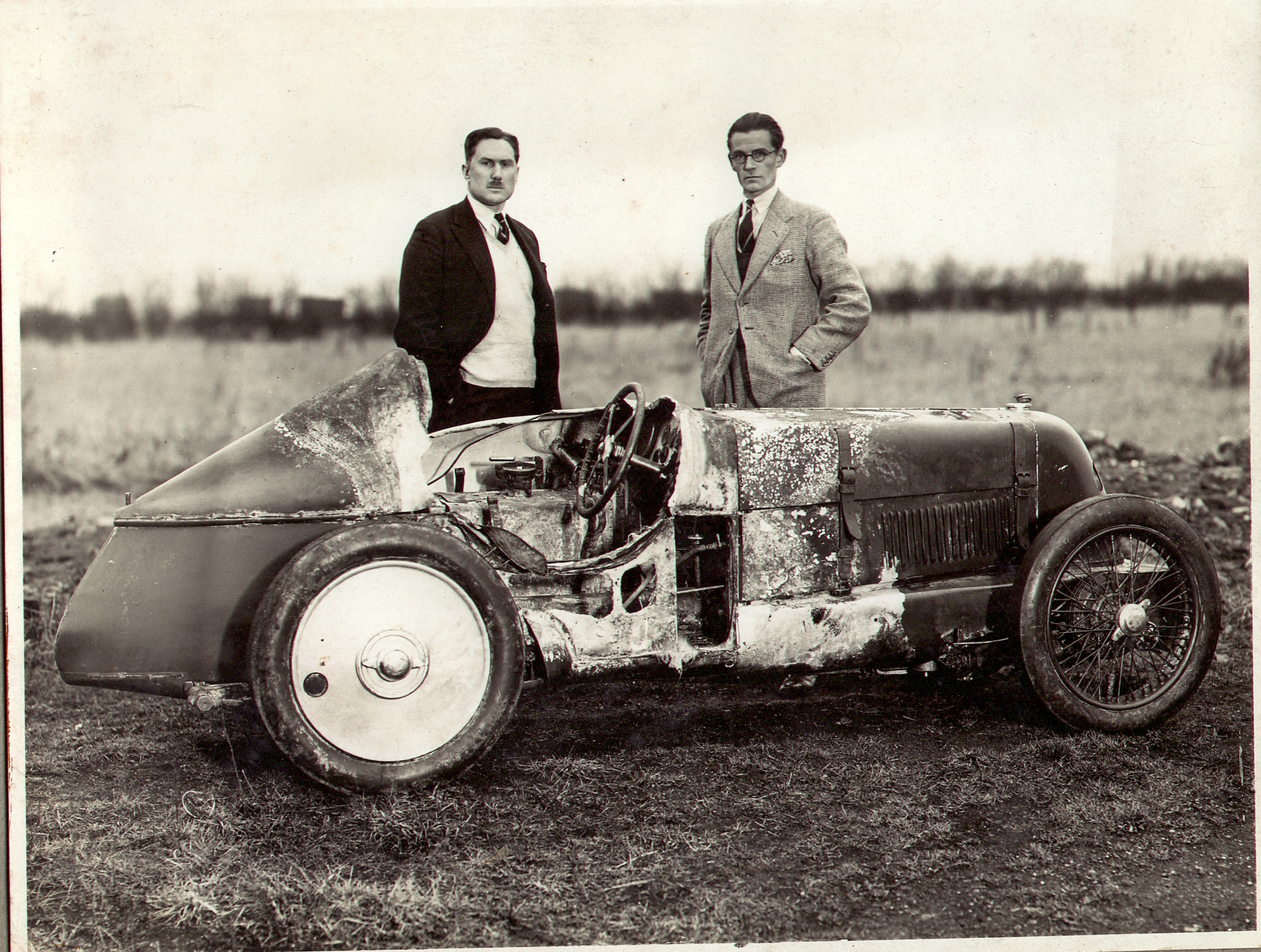
Eyston (left) with fire-damaged MG Midget, 1931

Captain George Edward Thomas Eyston MC OBE (28 June 1897 – 11 June 1979) was a British engineer, inventor, and racing driver best known for breaking the land speed record three times between 1937 and 1939.

== Early life ==
George Eyston was educated at Stonyhurst College and Trinity College, Cambridge. His study of engineering at Cambridge was interrupted by World War I when he was commissioned in the Dorset Regiment and later served in the Royal Field Artillery. After the war he returned to Trinity College and was captain of the First Trinity Boat Club.

== Career ==
=== Motor racing ===
Eyston's racing career began before World War One, when he was still a schoolboy, and raced motorcycles under an assumed name. After the war (in which he was awarded the Military Cross) he reverted to his own name, moved on to car racing and entered European road races, particularly in Bugattis, with success in races such as the 1921 and 1926 French Grand Prix

Later he became well known for racing supercharged MGs such as the Magic Midget and the K3 Magnette. His entries with the K3 included the 1933 Isle of Man and 1934 Northern Ireland Tourist Trophy events, and the 1934 Mille Miglia

=== Speed records ===
He fitted a diesel engine from an AEC bus into a car built on a Chrysler chassis and used it to set high-speed endurance records at Brooklands, attaining 100.75 mph in 1933 and 106 mph in 1936. He also achieved his fastest at 357.5 mph in 1938.

In 1935, he was one of the first British racers to travel to the Bonneville salt flats of Utah, with his 24- and 48-hour record-setting car Speed of the Wind.

He is best known today for land speed records set in his car Thunderbolt. Between 1937 and 1939 he set three new land speed records, wresting them from Malcolm Campbell's Blue Bird, but was twice bettered by John Cobb.

The rivalry was friendly, and in later years Eyston, as competitions manager for Castrol, assisted with Cobb's ill-fated attempt on the water speed record in Crusader.

Thunderbolt's first record was set at 311.42 miles per hour (501.18 km/h) (502.12 km/h) on 19 November 1937 on the Bonneville Salt Flats. Within a year, Thunderbolt returned with improved aerodynamics and raised its record to 345.50 miles per hour (556.03 km/h) on 27 August 1938.

Eyston was also involved in the design of his Thunderbolt car at the Bean Cars factory in Tipton, Staffordshire (now West Midlands).

=== Patents and engineering ===
As an engineer and inventor, he held a number of patents related to motor engineering and particularly supercharging. His work on developing high-power gearboxes was important for Thunderbolt, along with his invention of the Powerplus supercharger used on MGs.

=== World War II ===
During World War II Eyston served on various bodies connected with industry and was a Regional Controller for the Ministry of Production.

== Honours and awards ==
- Eyston was awarded the Military Cross on 18 July 1917 - 2nd Lt. (temp Lt.) George Edward Thomas Eyston, RFA., Spec. Res. For conspicuous gallantry and devotion to duty. He rendered most valuable service when carrying out reconnaissance under heavy fire. On several occasions he went forward under heavy shell and machine gun fire. He carried out his duties with great courage and determination, and was able to obtain most valuable information.
- He was awarded the Segrave Trophy in 1935.
- He was made a chevalier of the Légion d'honneur in 1938.
- He was made an OBE in 1948.

== Racing record ==
=== 24 Hours of Le Mans results ===
Year	Team	Co-Drivers	Car	Class	Laps	Pos.	Class Pos.
1928	(United Kingdom) Aston Martin International	(United Kingdom) A C Bertelli	Aston Martin 1½ International	1.5	32	DNF	DNF
1929	(United Kingdom) Colonel Warwick Wright	(United Kingdom) Richard Watney	Stutz DV32	8.0	104	DNF	DNF

=== Complete European Championship results ===
(key) (Races in bold indicate pole position) (Races in italics indicate fastest lap)

Year	Entrant	Chassis	Engine	1	2	3	EDC	Pts
1931	Sir Henry Birkin	Maserati 26M	Maserati 2.5 L8	ITA	FRA; 4	BEL	—^{1}	

Notes

- **^1** – Eyston was co-driver with Birkin at the French GP and Birkin drove with Lewis at the Belgian GP, therefore rules excluded Eyston from the Championship.

== Publications ==
- G.E.T. Eyston (1933). Flat Out. John Miles. foreword by Sir Malcolm Campbell
- G.E.T. Eyston; Barré Lyndon (1935). Motor Racing and Record Breaking.
- George Eyston; W.F. Bradley (1936). Speed on Salt. Batsford.
- George Eyston (1939). Fastest on Earth.
