= MG C-type =

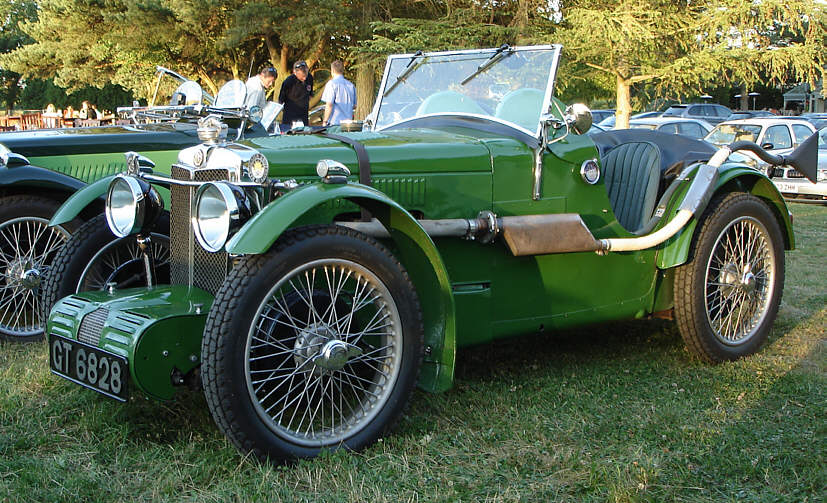

Overview
- Manufacturer: MG
- Production: 1931–1932
- Assembly: United Kingdom: Abingdon, Oxfordshire, England

Body and chassis
- Class: sports car
- Layout: FR layout

Powertrain
- Engine: 746 cc In-line 4

The MG C-type is a sports car that was produced by MG from 1931 to 1932. It was designed for competition use and based on the M-Type Midget. A special car, called the EX120, had been developed from the M-Type for George Eyston to make an attempt on the 750 cc class 24-hour record at Autodrome de Montlhéry in France. The attempt was successful and a series of replica cars were made which became the C-Type.

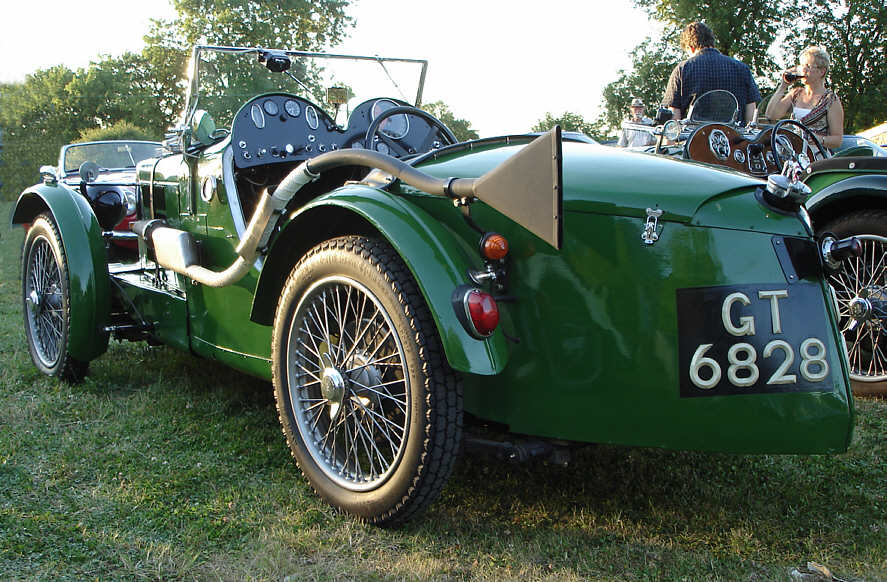
The pointed tail of the C-type

The car used a tuned short-stroke (73 mm) version of the bevel gear driven overhead camshaft engine from the 1928 Morris Minor and Wolseley 10 with a single SU carburettor and a new crankshaft producing 44 bhp (33 kW) at 6400 rpm. It could from 1932 be had with the crossflow head to be seen later on the MG J-type and a Powerplus supercharger version was also available with 52.4 bhp (39.1 kW) at 6500 rpm. Drive was to the rear wheels through a four-speed non-synchromesh gearbox. The chassis was new and took the form of a ladder frame with tubular cross members and passed under the rear axle. The suspension used half-elliptic springs and Hartford friction shock absorbers with rigid front and rear axles and centre lock wire wheels. The car had a wheelbase of 81 inches (2057 mm) and a track of 42 inches (1067 mm).

The body, which had no doors, was metal over an ash frame and had a pointed tail which held the spare wheel and cycle type front wings. Later cars had a more conventional rear with a slab-type fuel tank. The exhaust pipe was routed outside the car and finished with a spectacular fishtail. The record-breaking cars had a streamlined cowl over the radiator, but this was not usually fitted to later cars as it could cause overheating unless high speeds were maintained.

The standard car initially cost £295 or £345 for the supercharged version, rising to £490 and £575 by the end of production.

As well as the Montlhéry record, C-Types were used in many other competition events including a works team of fourteen cars entered in the 1931 Double Twelve event at Brooklands, where they took the first five places.
