= Dumb iron =

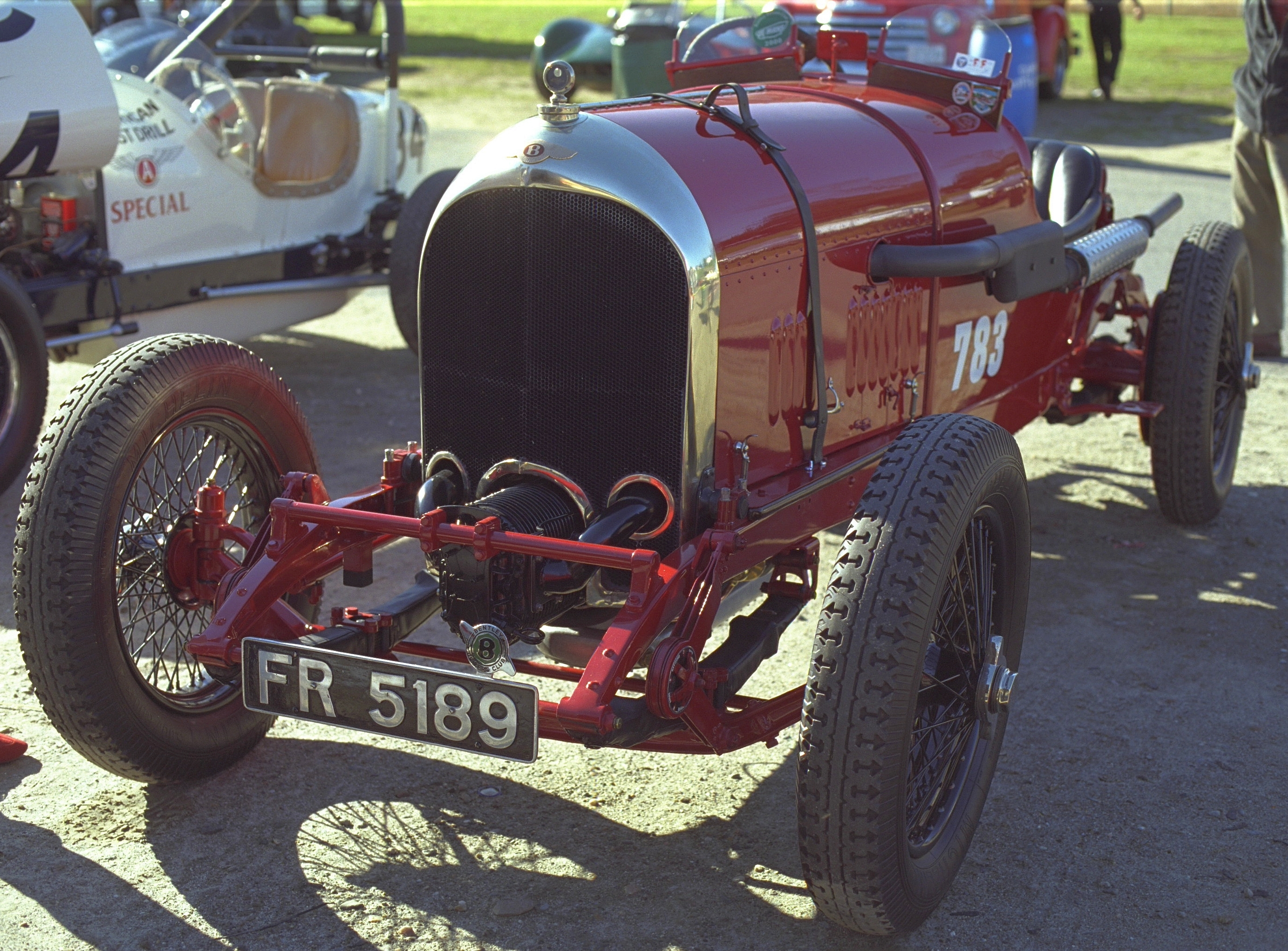
Dumb irons are the downward-curving "horns" forming the front ends of the chassis side-rails

A dumb iron is a "curved side piece of a chassis, to which the front springs are attached."

Dumb irons are mainly featured on vehicles built before 1950, which had their front axle suspended on leaf springs. At the front of the car, dumb irons project forward, providing a location to attach the front of the leaf springs; The modern alternative is a suspension mount.
