= Land Rover Group =

Division of British Leyland and later the Rover Group

- Industry: Automotive
- Founded: 1981
- Defunct: 1987
- Fate: Acquired by British Aerospace
- Successor: Rover Group (Land Rover); Leyland DAF (Freight Rover)
- Headquarters: Birmingham, England
- Products: Freight Rover 200; Freight Rover 300; Land Rover Ninety/One Ten/127; Land Rover Series III; Leyland Sherpa; Leyland Sherpa K2; Range Rover

Land Rover Group (LRG) was a division of British Leyland (BL) and later the Rover Group that was in existence between 1981 and 1987. LRG brought British Leyland's light commercial vehicle production under one management, consisting of the Land Rover utility 4x4 range, the Range Rover luxury 4x4 and the former Leyland Sherpa van range (re-branded Freight Rover to match the other group members in 1984). LRG operated two factories in the Birmingham area – the Solihull plant and the Freight Rover plant at Washwood Heath.

== Formation ==
The group was formed to produce a more logical management structure within the BL group – prior to the creation of LRG the Land Rover business was part of the Jaguar Rover Triumph or specialist division, makers of luxury cars, whilst the Sherpa van was part of the Leyland Truck & Bus division and the only light commercial product in a range otherwise made up of full-size commercial vehicles. Land Rover had already been detached from the Specialist Division in 1978, when a new BL subsidiary called "Land Rover Ltd" was created, that consisted of the Solihull assembly plant, and its satellites – along with the production and development of both the Series Land Rover and Range Rover. The second phase of these reforms would be to move Rover passenger car production out of Solihull – in 1981 production of the Rover SD1 was moved to Cowley, where all future large Rover cars would be produced until the break-up of the Rover Group (as BL was by then called), by BMW in 2000.

== Development ==
The Land Rover part of the group saw the most product development in an (ultimately successful) attempt to turn around a severe decline in Land Rover sales in the early 1980s (a 25% fall between 1980 and 1981 alone). A modernised and improved Land Rover model range was launched in stages between 1983 and 1985 (the Land Rover Ninety/One Ten/127 range, with new engines, transmissions, suspension and interiors. The Range Rover was gradually pushed up-market into the luxury car sector with a facelift and with more powerful engines, an automatic gearbox, 5 doors and new interior features such as leather seats and air conditioning. Throughout the mid-1980s new engines were added to the Land Rover line-up, including more powerful V8 petrol engines and a turbodiesel model.

The Sherpa van was given an immediate facelift in 1981, creating the 'K2' series, which was only available for a few years before the Freight Rover business was expanded to a two-model range. The original narrow-body Sherpa became the Freight Rover 200-series, whilst a new wider-bodied model with a heavier payload was introduced in 1984 called the Freight Rover 300-series. The 300-series came in a range of wheelbases and body styles. The 300-series also brought with it a new look for the Freight Rover products with square headlights and a new grille which was also applied to the 200 Series (although the smaller model retained its round lights). The new model used adapted versions of the new 2.5-litre diesel engine from Land Rover, but the 200-series retained the venerable 1.8-litre B-Series diesel, although from 1985 the V8 petrol engine and gearbox combination from the Land Rover range was available as a high-power option. A logical new addition to the Freight Rover range was a 4x4 version of the 200-series van using a standard sherpa back axle and a custom made front axle using a modified rear axle casing with custom made swivel assemblies. they also using a dana 300 transfer box to split the drive, which meant they could use a standard sherpa gearbox. This model was only available as a special order to fleet and military buyers- whilst popular with utility companies and contractors it was never offered for general sale because it risked taking sales from the Land Rover One Ten and 127.

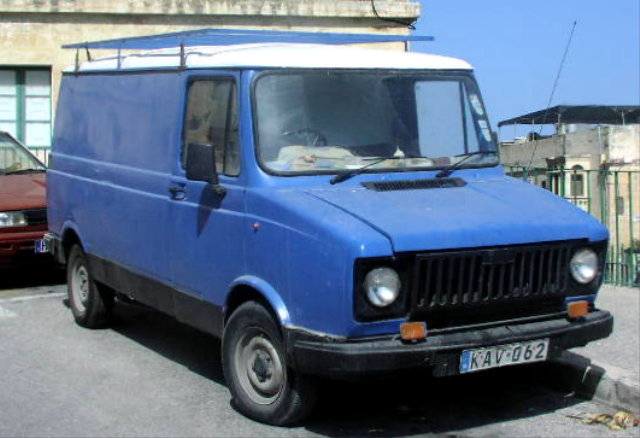
Freight Rover 200-series

== Merger and break-up ==
In 1986 British Leyland was renamed the Rover Group in preparation for privatisation. This saw LRG, Leyland Trucks and Leyland Bus reunited into the Land Rover Leyland Group, but with each division remaining operationally separate.

This was a short-lived arrangement. In 1986 Leyland Bus became a private company, the subject of a management buyout, later being acquired by Volvo. In 1987 the Leyland Trucks division (including the Freight Rover van making interests) merged with the Dutch DAF Trucks company to form DAF NV (which in the UK traded as Leyland DAF). DAF NV was later floated on the Dutch stock exchange. Land Rover was retained by the Rover Group and the latter was sold to British Aerospace in 1988.

== Products ==
Land Rover

- Land Rover Series III (1981–1985)
- Land Rover Ninety/One Ten/127 (1983–1987)

Range Rover

- Range Rover (1981–1987)

Freight Rover

- Leyland Sherpa (1981–1982)
- Leyland Sherpa K2 (1982–1984)
- Freight Rover 200 (1984–1987)
- Freight Rover 300 (1984–1987)
