= LDV Convoy =

Leyland DAF 400, LDV Convoy
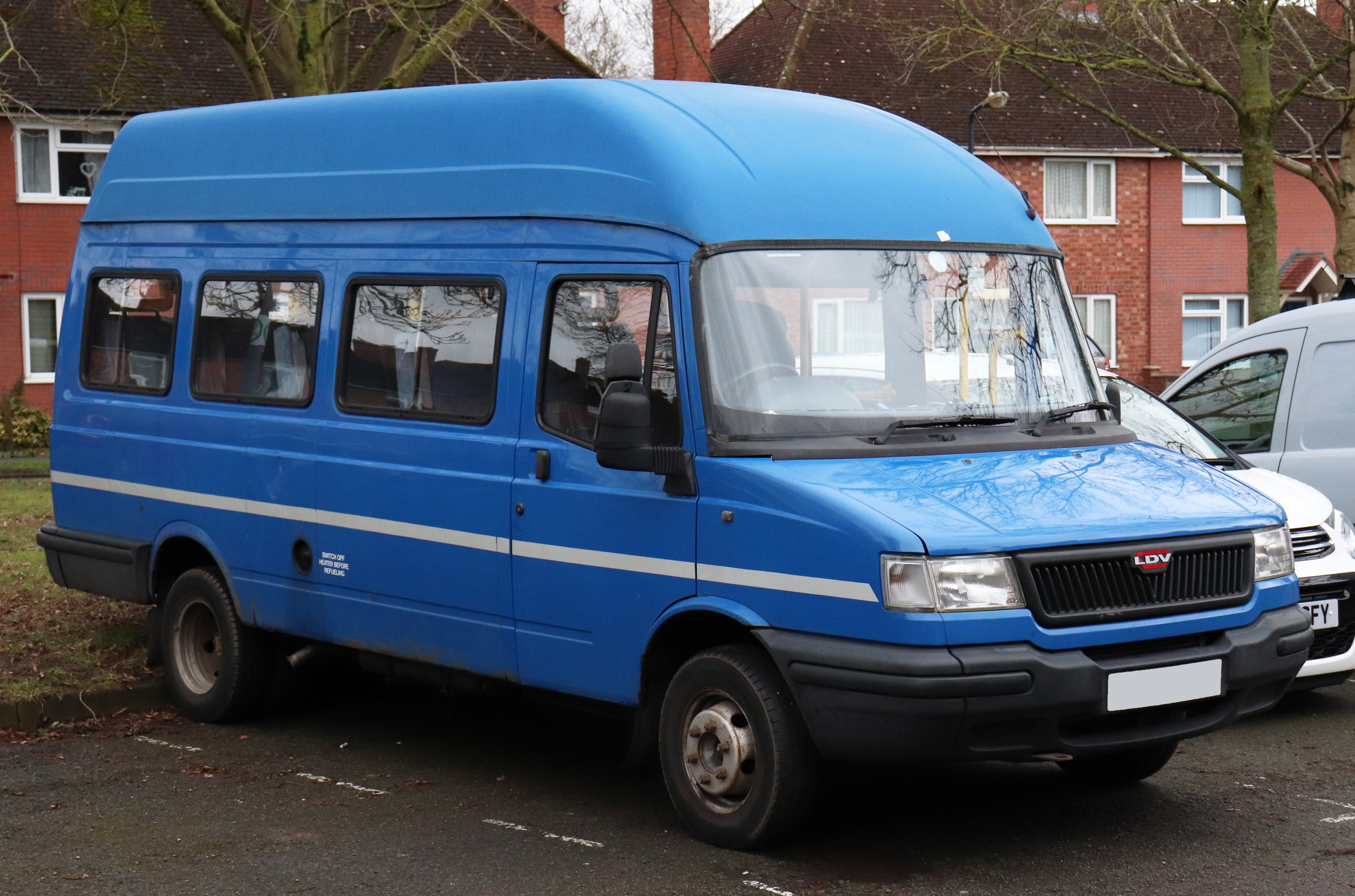
- LDV Convoy minibus

Overview
- Manufacturer: British Leyland, LDV Limited
- Production: 1984–2006

Body and chassis
- Class: Light commercial vehicle (M)
- Body style: Van
- Related: LDV Pilot

Chronology
- Predecessor: Freight Rover Sherpa
- Successor: LDV Maxus

The LDV Convoy is a light commercial van that was manufactured from 1983 until 2006. The Convoy and its predecessors were wider and longer versions of the Freight Rover Sherpa, based on the Leyland Sherpa series of vans from 1974 and later known as the LDV Pilot. Originally sold as the Freight Rover Sherpa 285/310/350 (commonly referred to as the Sherpa 300 Series), it became the Leyland DAF 400 Series in 1989, the LDV 400 series in 1993, and then finally settled on the Convoy name in 1996.

== History ==
=== Freight Rover 300 Series (1984–1989) ===
Freight Rover 300 Series
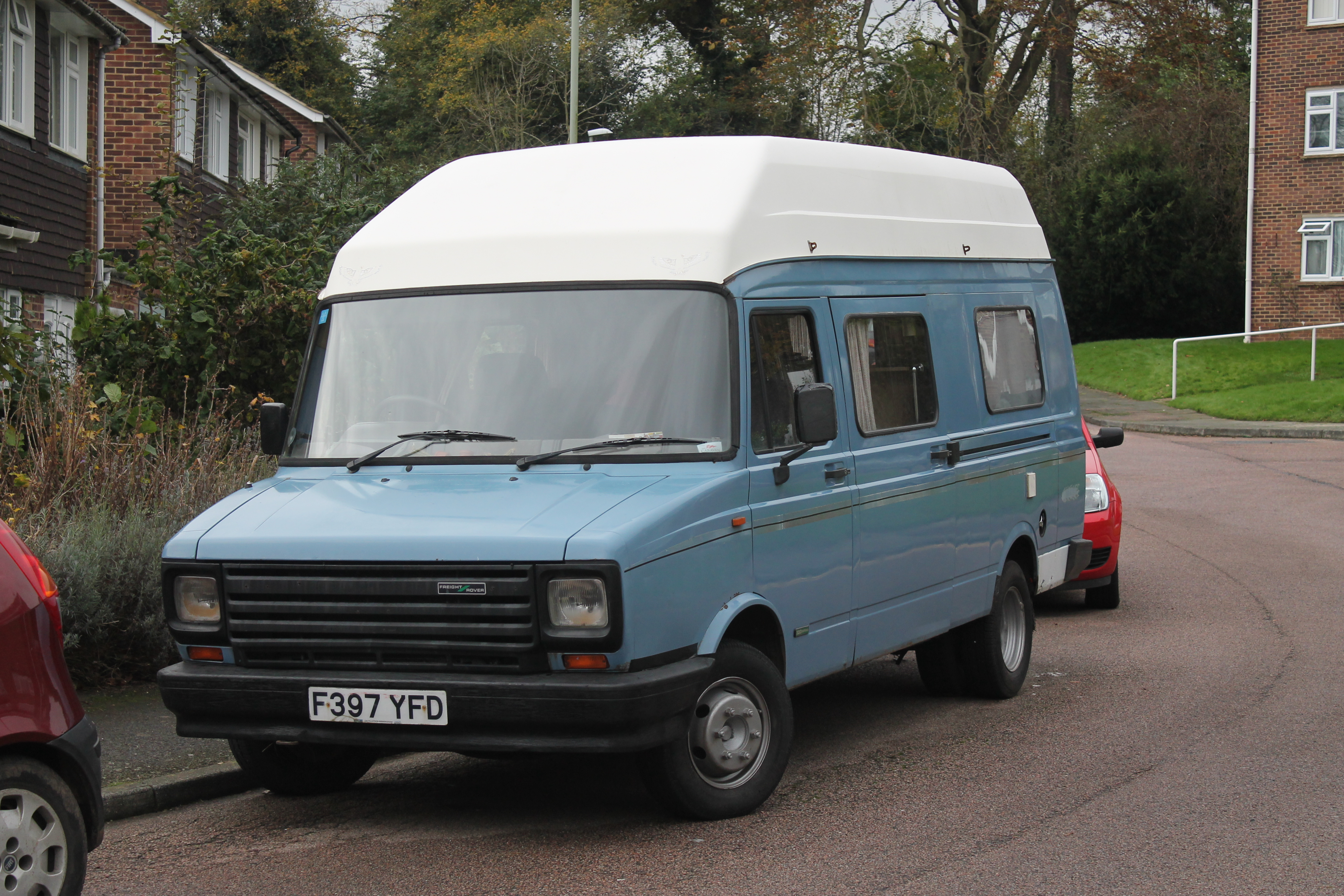

Overview
- Manufacturer: Freight Rover
- Production: 1984–1989

Body and chassis
- Class: Van
- Related: Freight Rover 200 Series

Chronology
- Predecessor: Freight Rover Sherpa
- Successor: Leyland DAF 400 Series

In 1984, the Sherpa was facelifted, becoming the Freight Rover 200 Series. Alongside the original body style, there was a new wide-bodied variant — the 300 Series, available in a choice of three wheelbase lengths.

Of the 300 Series, the 285 and 310 models were single wheel, the 300 and 350 models being twin. While capacity for the 200 Series remained at 5.4 cubic metres (190 cubic feet), that of the 300 Series ranged from 7.6 m^{3} (270 cu ft) to 11.4 m^{3} (400 cu ft), depending on the combination of wheelbase and roof profile (a high roof was an option for the lwb 310 and 350 models).

For those who needed yet more space, a Luton van body was offered, built on either the 255 or 350 chassis cabs, providing capacities of 11.3 m^{3} (400 cu ft) (with 200 Series cab) or 15.6 m^{3} (550 cu ft) (300 Series), and a maximum payload of almost two tonnes. The chassis cab also formed the basis for a standard and wide-bodied drop side pickup, in 255, 280, 285, 310, and 350 versions, again available with either short or long wheelbases.

Of course, the chassis cab could also be ordered on its own, again in a choice of widths and lengths, so that bespoke bodywork could be fitted, with the added option of either single or double cabs. The 200 Series continued to be offered as minibus or crewbus, but the 300 Series was also offered as a minicoach seating up to 18 people.

While the K2 Sherpa's engine remained available on the Freight Rovers (including the ancient B-series diesel), Land Rover's 2.5-litre 14J diesel unit was now offered on the 300 Series. Following the completion of a special police contract, the Rover 3.5-litre V8 unit also became available from 1986, and immediately became popular with emergency services and express delivery operators.

However, with the merger of Freight Rover, along with the rest of the Leyland Trucks division of the Rover Group with DAF Trucks the following year, to form the new DAF NV and Leyland DAF companies, the Rover Group ceased to be a player in this sector of the light commercial market.

=== Leyland DAF 400 Series (1989–1993) ===
Leyland DAF 400 Series
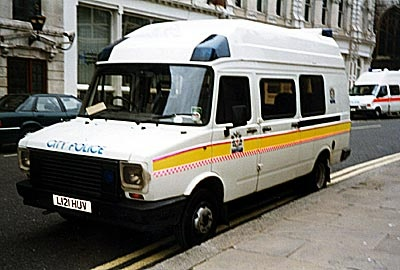
- Leyland DAF 400 of the City of London Police

Overview
- Manufacturer: Leyland DAF
- Also called: DAF 400 Series
- Production: 1989–1997

Body and chassis
- Class: Van
- Related: Leyland DAF 200 Series

Chronology
- Predecessor: Freight Rover 300 Series
- Successor: LDV Convoy

With Freight Rover becoming part of Leyland DAF the 300 Series was superseded by the 400 Series, which also offered air suspension and a 2.5-litre Peugeot-sourced diesel engine (praised by contemporary reviewers for reliability, but changed later on for the Ford Di engine from the Transit which was described as 'superb' by reviewers).

At this stage, it was given a new radiator grille, bearing the Leyland DAF badge. A low-compression version of the 2.0L O-Series petrol engine remained available (but was dropped in 1991 due to lack of demand), in addition to the 3.5-litre Rover V8 (pictured) which was popular with police and ambulance services, where it was often mated to a ZF 4HP22 transmission.

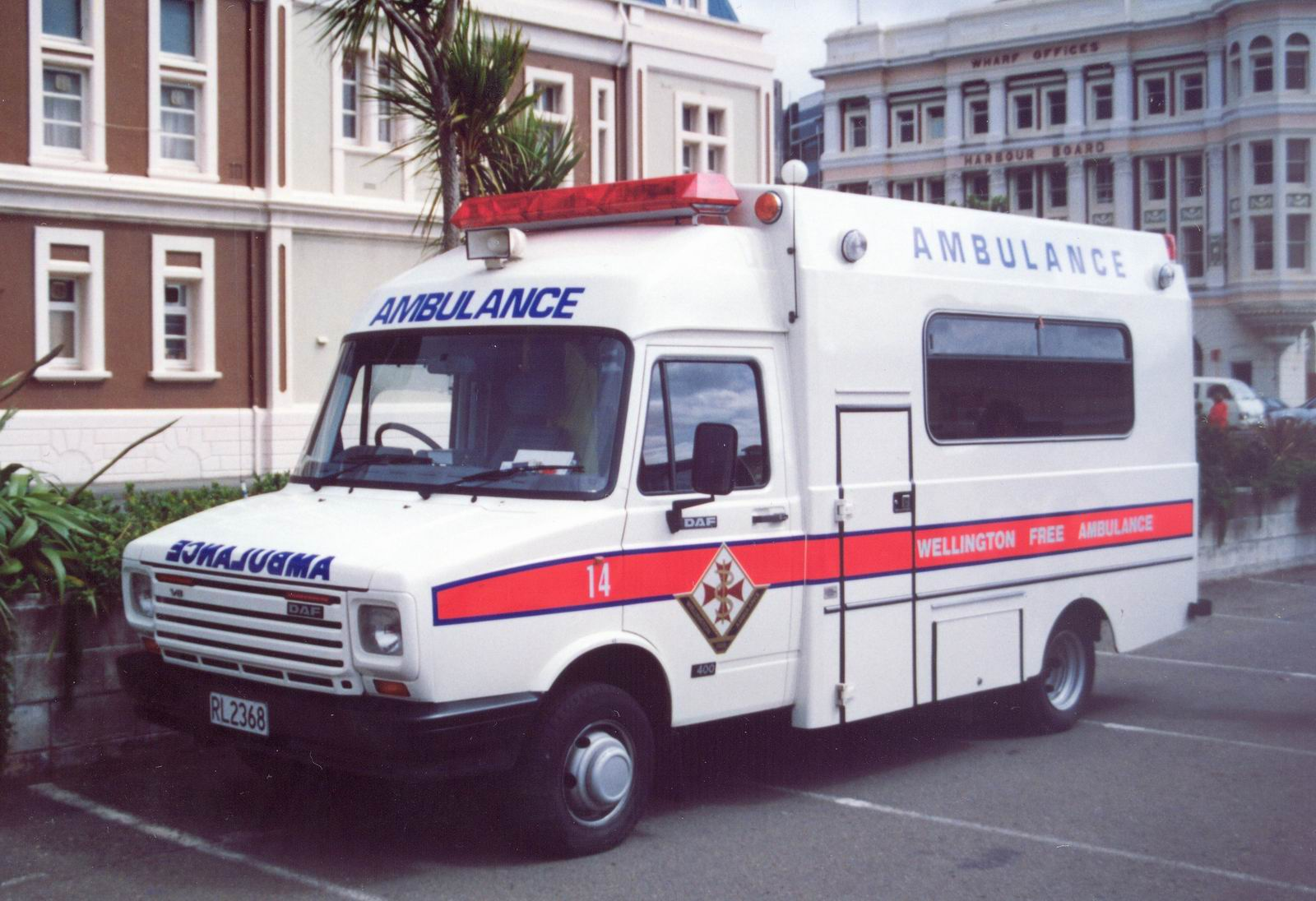
Wellington Free Ambulance Leyland DAF 400 Series

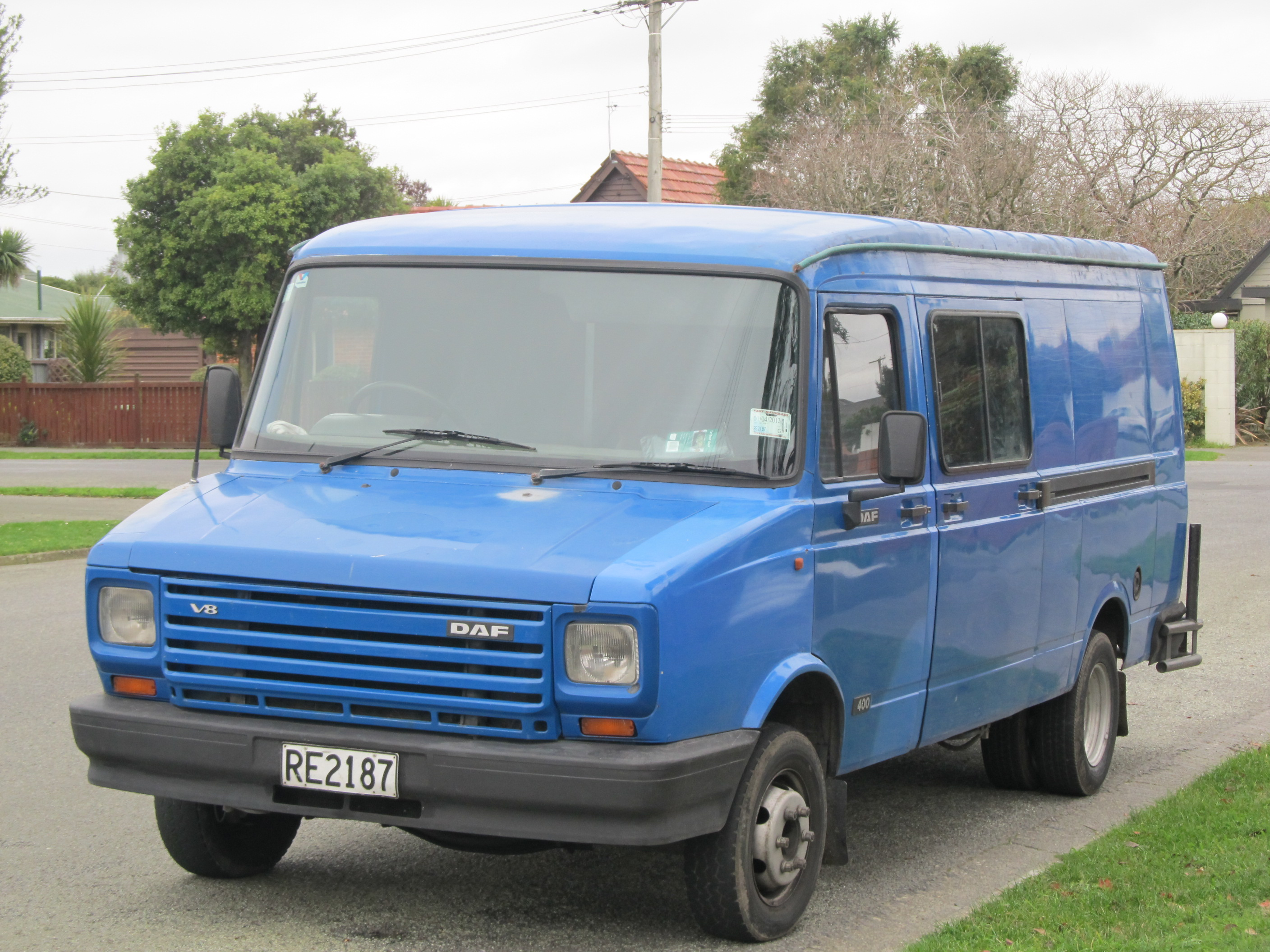
Low topped DAF 400 Series

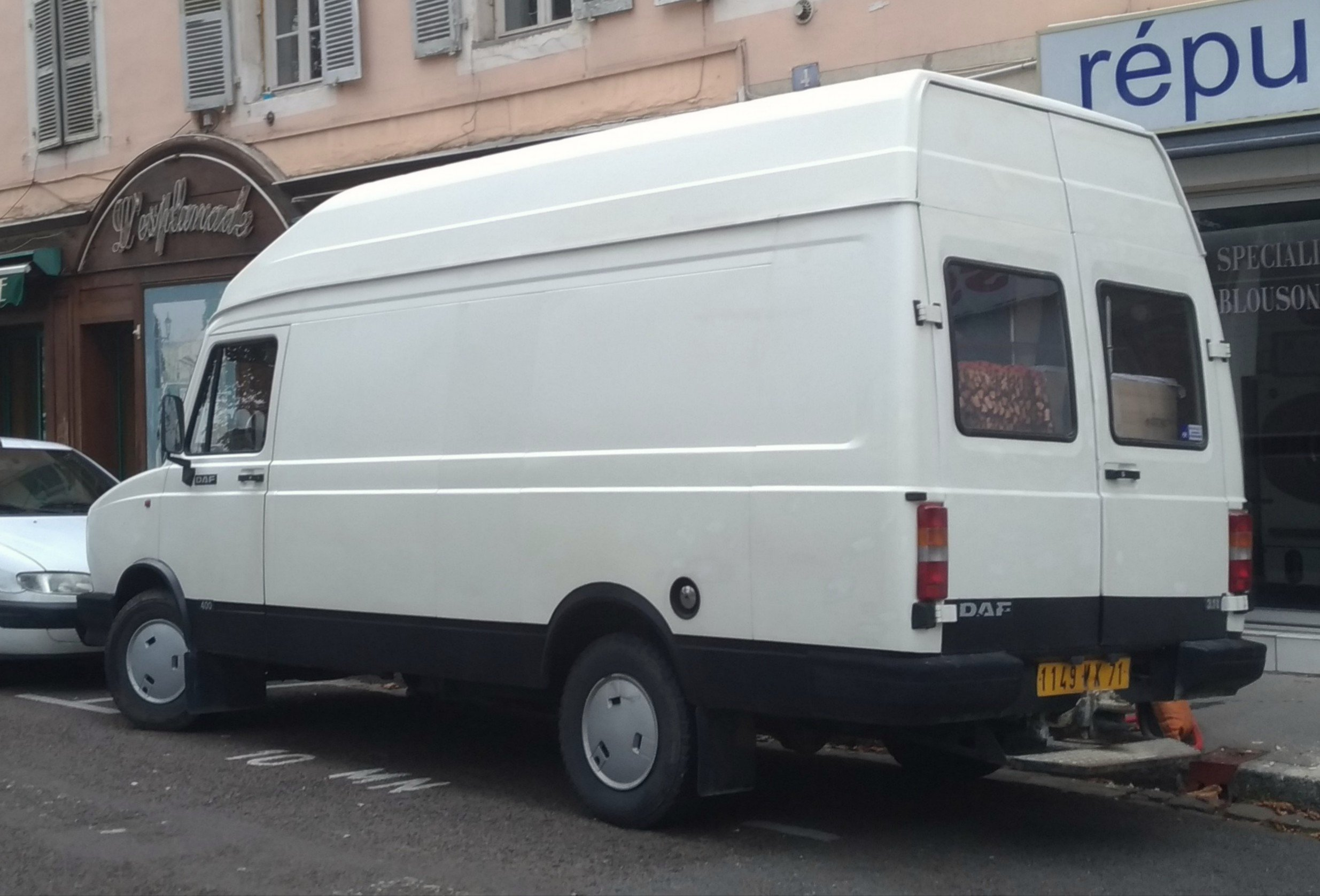
DAF 400 Series rear

=== LDV 400 and Convoy (1993–2006) ===
LDV Convoy
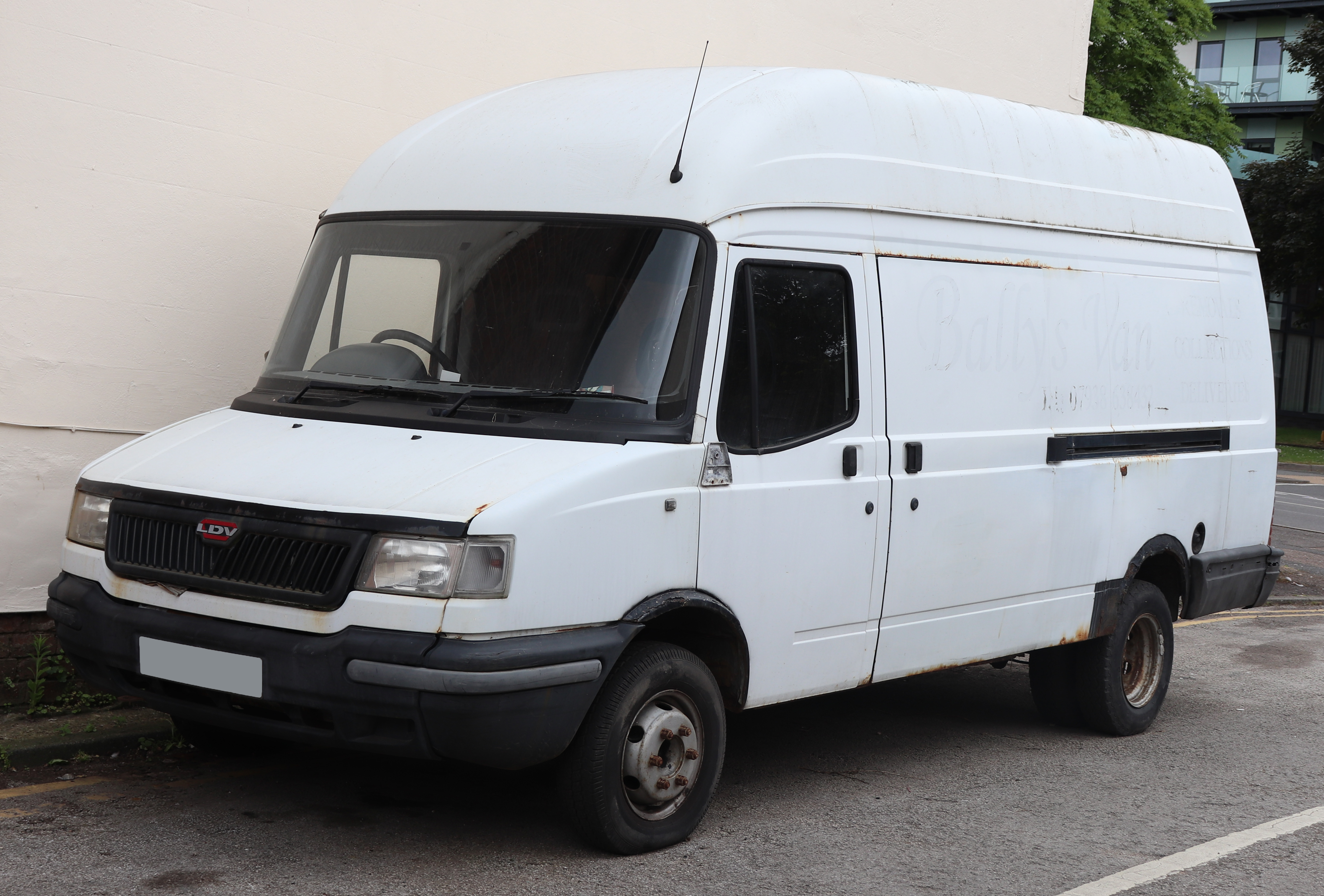
- Post-facelift high-topped LDV Convoy van

Overview
- Manufacturer: LDV Limited
- Production: 1996–2006
- Assembly: United Kingdom: Washwood Heath, Birmingham
- Designer: Tom Karen

Body and chassis
- Class: Van
- Layout: FR layout
- Related: LDV Pilot

Powertrain
- Engine: 2.5 L Peugeot EN55 I4 (diesel); 2.5 L Peugeot ET70 I4 (turbodiesel); 2.5 L York I4 (diesel); 2.5 L York I4 (turbodiesel); 2.4 L Duratorq I4 (turbodiesel); 2.0 L Ford 8-valve I4 (LPG); 3.5 L Rover V8 (petrol, ambulance)
- Transmission: 5-speed MT75 manual 4-speed automatic

Chronology
- Predecessor: Leyland DAF 400 Series
- Successor: LDV Maxus

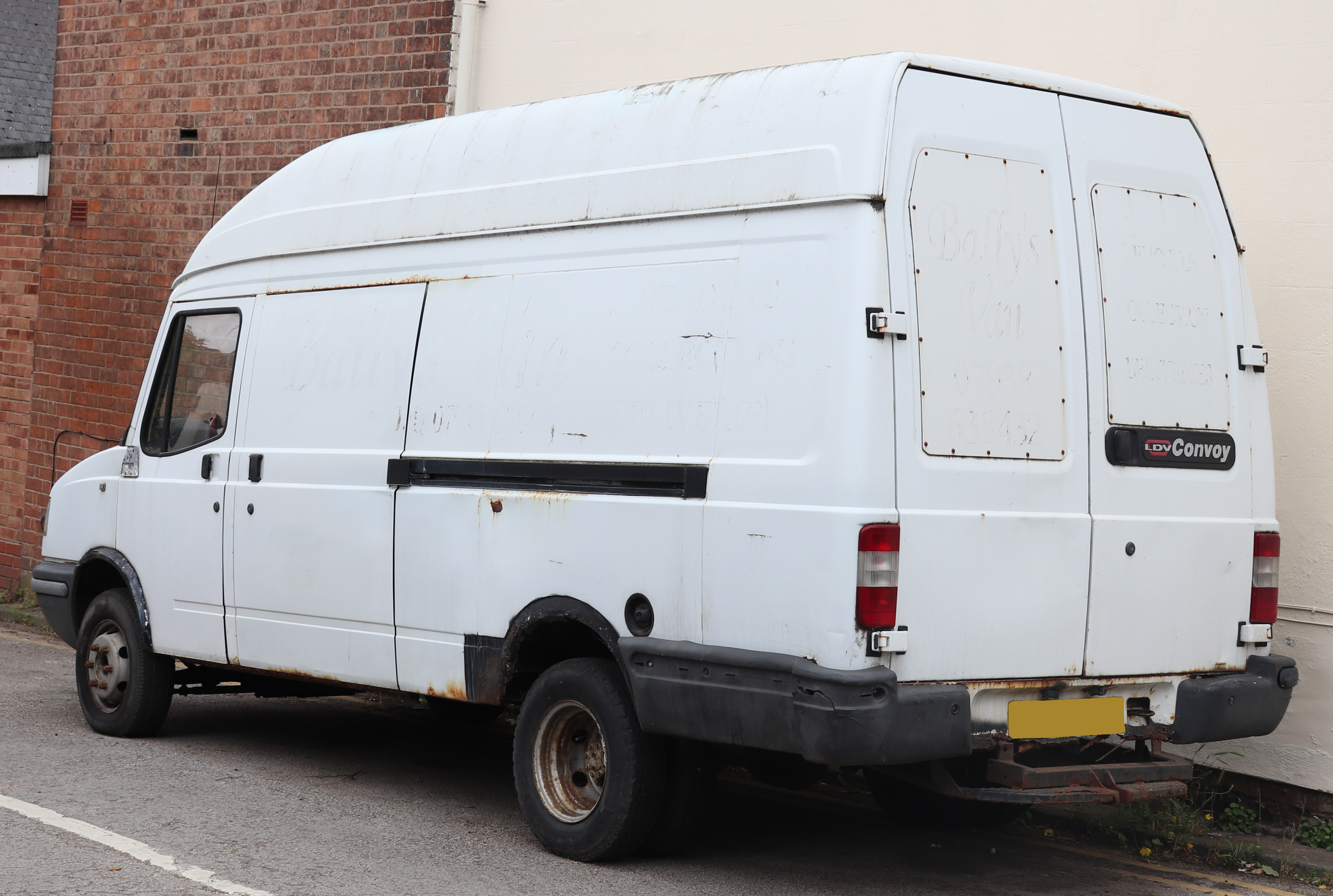
Rear of a high-topped LDV Convoy

Pre-facelift high-topped LDV Convoy bus

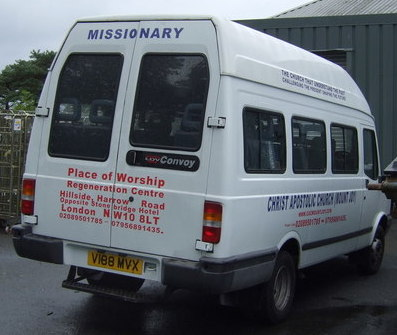
Pre-facelift high-topped LDV Convoy bus

Following the sell-off of the van business from the insolvent Leyland DAF in 1993, LDV Limited was formed. In 1996, the 400 van received a facelift from Ogle Design and was renamed the 'Convoy'. Changes included new bumpers, a new bonnet, and a redesigned radiator grille, as well as improved headlamps (which were 40% brighter than those on the 400). The indicators were also changed to a new 'wraparound'-style design.

The van's key selling point for operators such as the Royal Mail (who had operated large fleets since the original Sherpa version) and local authorities had been its narrower track compared to the Transit, enabling it to negotiate tight alleyways and country lanes, in addition to its simplicity making diagnosis, repairs, and maintenance uncomplicated (as an example, clutch repairs generally took just over two hours, most models had a 15,000-mile service interval, and tyres were easy to obtain), and the fact that it was made in the United Kingdom. Due to these redeeming features, the Convoy achieved a market share of 10.5% in 1998.

==== Chassis ====
The Convoy was available in 2.8-tonne, 3.1-tonne and 3.5-tonne variants (the 3.5-tonne having a dual rear-wheel setup for safety and improved handling) with load volume capacities up to 12.9 cubic metres, which were highly praised on release by reviewers as 'best in class'. An extra long wheelbase version was also available. The chassis was described as 'tough as old boots', 'smart', and 'cool and sophisticated' by pundits, but was criticised for 'scary handling in the wet' when empty.

The LDV 'SVO' (Specialist Vehicle Options) division boasted of its ability to coachbuild directly in the factory (located at Washwood Heath in Birmingham), making the vehicle popular with those requiring custom coachwork, such as disabled users, ice cream sellers, tow truck operators, those carrying frozen food, and fire brigades.

Even minor alterations such as roof racks (pictured below) could be fitted at the factory through this coachbuilding service, meaning that purchased vans could enter active service extremely quickly after delivery.

The van would also come in crew cab (up to seven seats) pickup and fleet-based vans, and was the cheapest full-size van on the market in the United Kingdom at the time, providing it with many fleet-based customers such as local authorities and government agencies.

Disc brakes were standard for the front (ventilated discs were available as an optional extra), drums standard for the rear, and the van used a traditional live rear axle setup, with leaf springs on all wheels. The van was available in both a low-topped (nicknamed 'City'), and a high-topped (nicknamed 'Hi-Loader') variant.

The chassis would also become hugely popular as a minibus (particularly with self-drive operators and schools) due to factory-based minibus conversions, enabling customers to obtain a fully type approved minibus without using a coachbuilding company (the first example of this business model in the United Kingdom). The in house minibus conversion was also the only seventeen-seater minibus available in the United Kingdom with a low roofline (pictured), making it extremely popular with operators that parked the vehicle in a garage, enough for LDV to take around 60% of the entire market of the United Kingdom for 17-seater minibuses.

The ride was described as 'primitive', and the handling was criticised for pronounced understeer. The 'boxy' shape was also subject to severe crosswinds, and the brakes were criticised as inadequate in some cases.

===== School bus =====
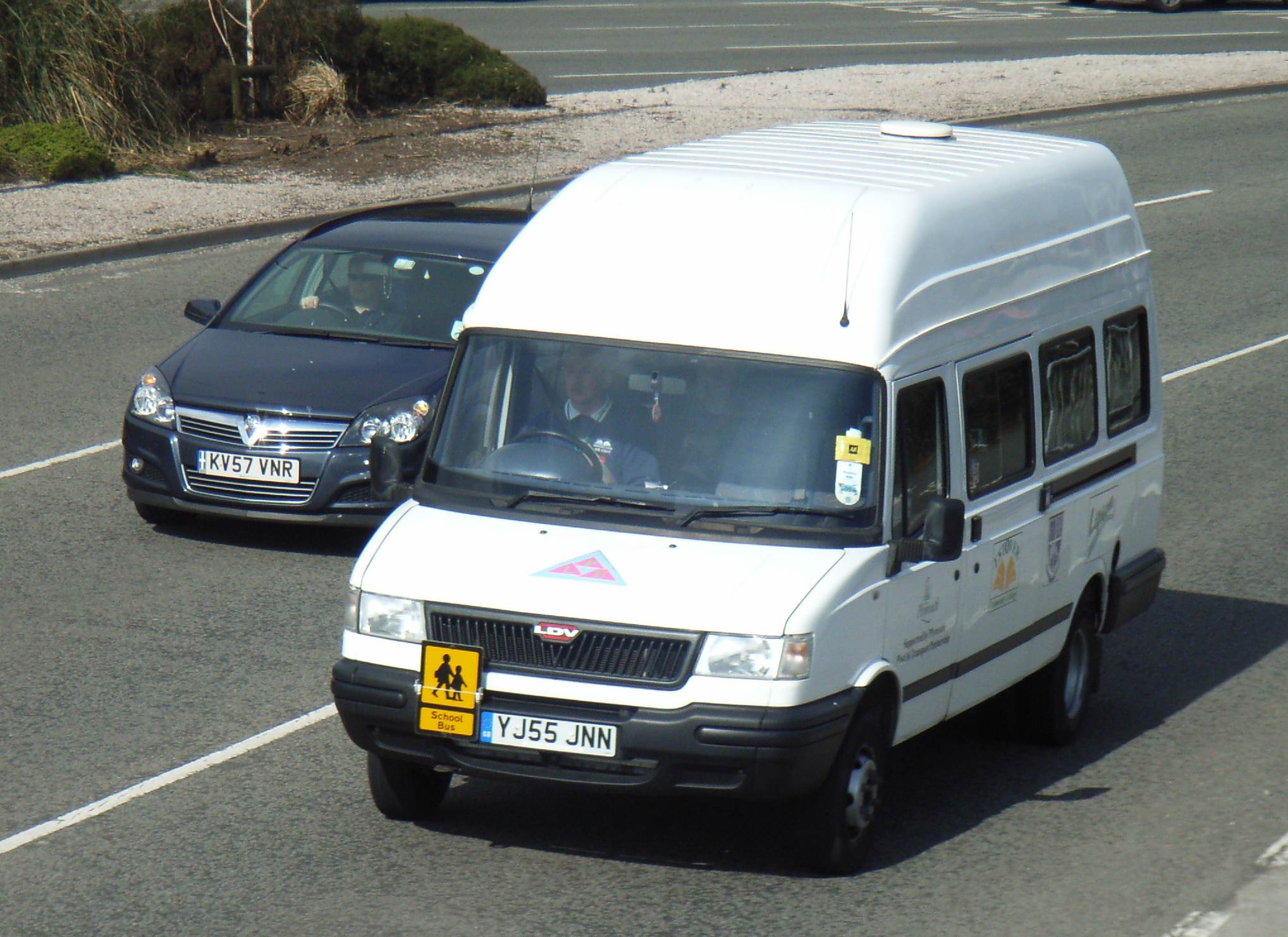
Late model LDV Convoy in custom Plymouth City Council school bus livery (not official LDV provided livery)

For schools in particular, LDV were also able to deliver a standard configuration type approved minibus in full reflective school livery and containing features relevant to school customers such as ABS, orange external flashing lighting, overhead storage racks, heavy-duty ventilation, a reverse warning siren, child-size three-point seat belts, and fire suppression systems.

The bus (the result of a survey of 31,000 schools) was unveiled at the 1998 British Motor Show, and professional driver training for three drivers was also free with the purchase of the vehicle, making it gain a reputation as the 'king of the primary schools'.

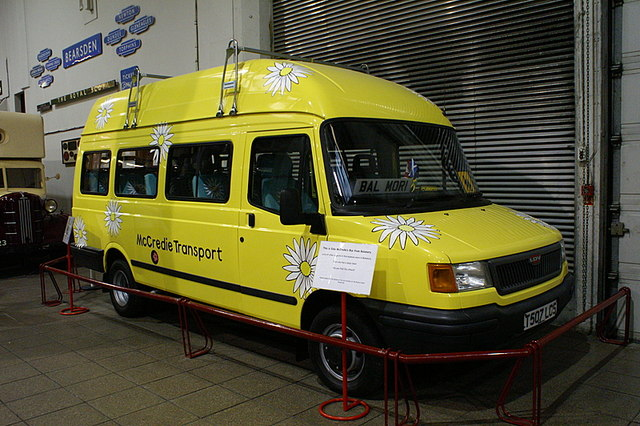
Another example of an aftermarket school bus configuration, from the set of the children's TV show Balamory, housed in the Glasgow Museum of Transport. Note the storage racks on the roof, an official LDV option, and an example of the custom coachwork fitted in house.

==== Interior ====
A three-seater cab was available as standard with adjustable seats and padded headrests, as was power steering, a digital clock, and an FM/AM radio/cassette. Airbags and seat belt pre tensioners were never available as options, and the lack of an air recirculation feature and a three-point seat belt for the middle passenger were criticised.

By the end of its life, the interior was described by reviewers as 'nasty' and a 'raid on the old British Leyland parts bin', containing components from the Austin Metro, Austin Maestro, Austin Montego, Austin Maxi, Austin FX4, Rover 800 (indicator stalks), and Morris Marina (interior door handles), all of which had long since left production by the Convoy era.

However, the interior was also described as 'durable', 'simple', 'no nonsense', and 'uncomplicated'. An alarm, tachograph, tachometer, air conditioning, and central locking were available as options, as was a twin battery setup with a heavy-duty alternator, which was fitted on the V8 ambulance versions to power medical equipment. The heavy-duty alternator was not available on the LPG version. there in the Glasgow Museum of Transport is the Balamory school bus

==== Engines ====
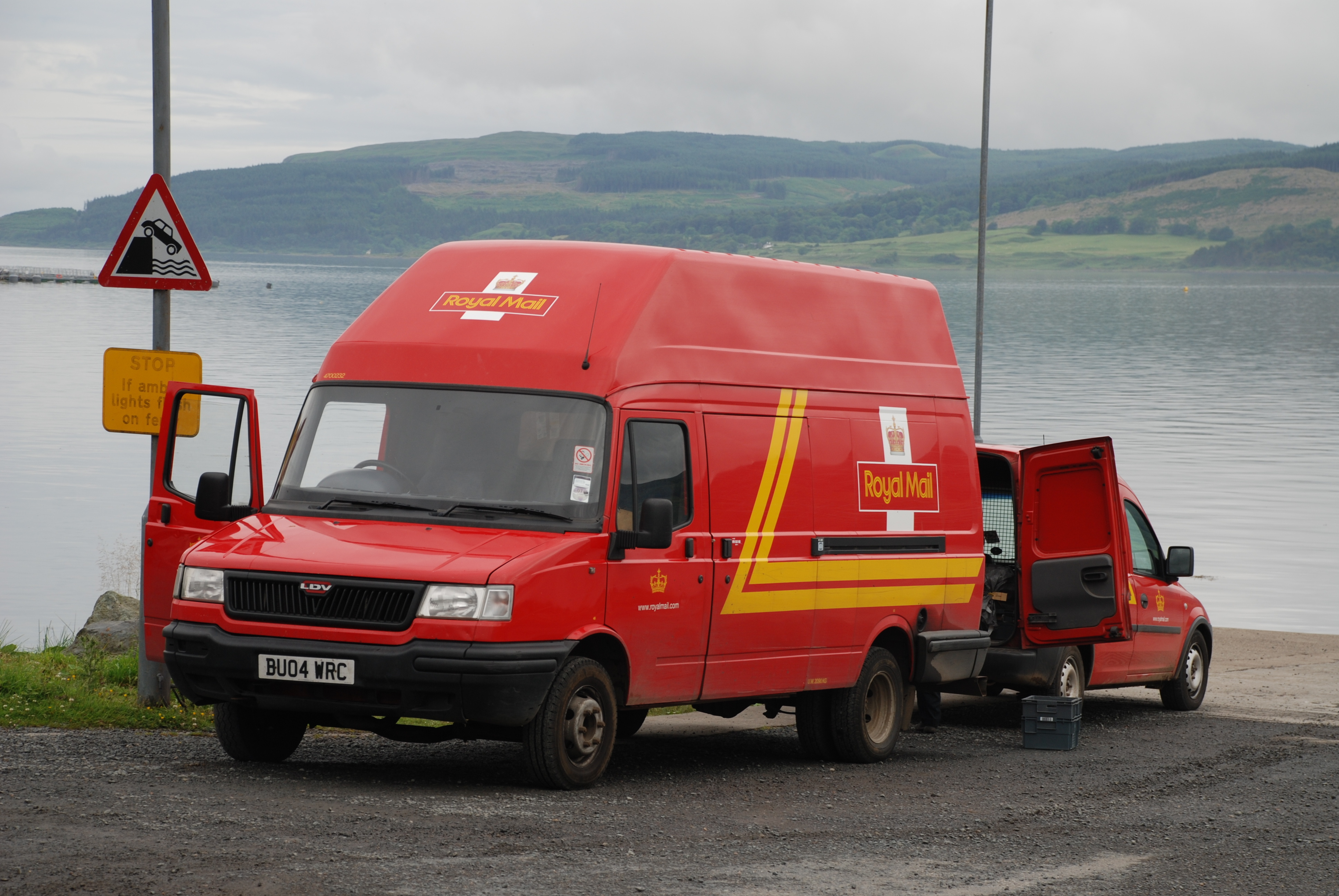
LDV Convoy pictured in Royal Mail livery on the Isle of Mull exchanging cargo with a Royal Mail Vauxhall Combo van

The drivetrain was available with a large number of engines (both turbocharged and non-turbocharged pre-Duratorq), sourced from Peugeot on early models, but engines from 1998 were mostly sourced from Ford, such as the York 'banana' engines which were described as 'dated', 'noisy' and 'ponderously slow', but 'dependable' and 'willing' with 'excellent cold starting' and offering 'lively performance'. The Peugeot engines were praised as 'economical', often seen as more so than many of the Ford units.

The turbocharged version of the 'banana' engine was fitted with electronic fuel injection sourced from Lucas Industries, while the non-turbocharged version had a mechanical system. The Ford Duratorq electronically controlled direct injection diesel engine appearing in 2002 (sourced from Ford Power Products as fitted to the Ford Transit, and described as 'not smooth') was fitted with a non-optional turbocharger, this was available with an optional intercooler, increasing the peak power output from 75PS to 90PS.

All engines were catalysed and were fitted with a drive-by-wire throttle setup that was initially criticised as dangerous but a revised pedal assembly from the Ford Transit resolved the early issues, and adjustable air suspension was available as an optional extra on long-wheelbase diesel models.

A factory LPG conversion (using an underfloor LPG tank and a rear-mounted petrol tank) was also available using a converted Ford eight-valve petrol engine with a peak power output of 115PS. This conversion was popular with police due to the high power output without the running costs of the V8 (explained below). The conversion did, however, significantly change the 'class-leading' warranty terms, the general warranty being reduced from 150,000 miles to 60,000 miles.

===== Ambulance/Police =====
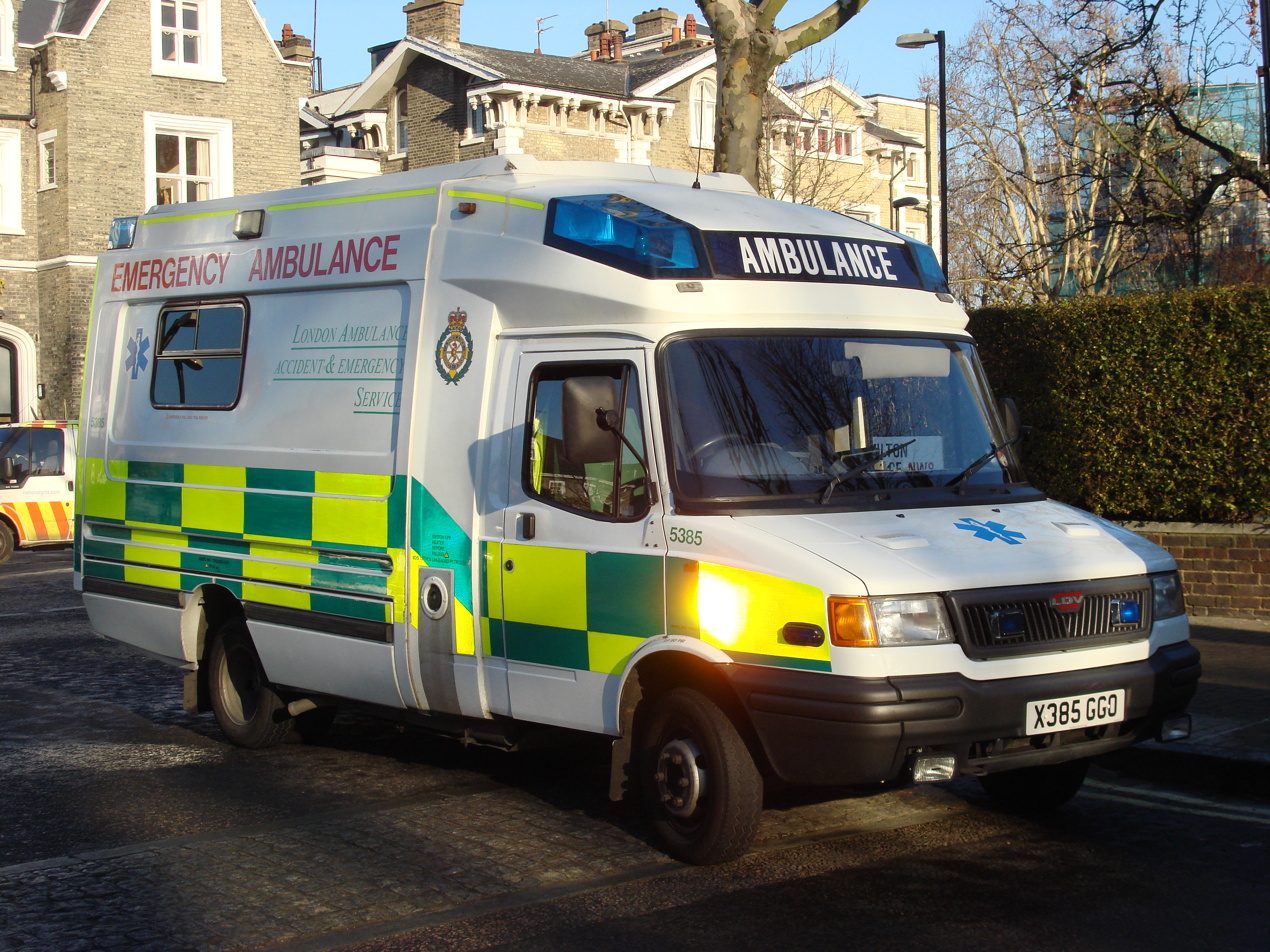
V8 Convoy ambulance pictured parked near Abbey Road Studios, in full London Ambulance Service livery. Note the two bonnet scoops.

The Rover V8 remained available in detuned 3.5L form (sourced from Land Rover) producing 135hp and was a common sight on the road as an ambulance with coachwork by the 'Universal Vehicle Group', this was due to be upgraded to a 3.7L unit; however, issues with the brakes meant that never materialised.

These ambulances were fitted with a limited-slip differential to improve handling, but were notorious for poor fuel economy, which was described as 'shocking' by experts, who said the engine was 'drinking fuel like a fish', with imperial miles per gallon readings rarely reaching double figures while in town (even when not on call).

Due to this issue, ambulance trusts started searching for more economical vehicles and began changing to Mercedes-Benz Sprinters with powerful diesel engines around 2003, further reducing profitability of the Convoy for LDV, as diesel engines with enough power for rapid response applications were never available on the Convoy and therefore the trusts had to migrate away from the platform. In addition, a hydraulic tail lift was standard on the Sprinter ambulances, but absent from the Convoy's coachwork, meaning that patients had to be manually lifted into the LDV by paramedics.

All Convoy ambulances had air suspension, external floodlights, and a four-speed automatic transmission. The bonnet on the ambulances featured two scoops to prevent the V8 from overheating in traffic when on call.

==== Support ====
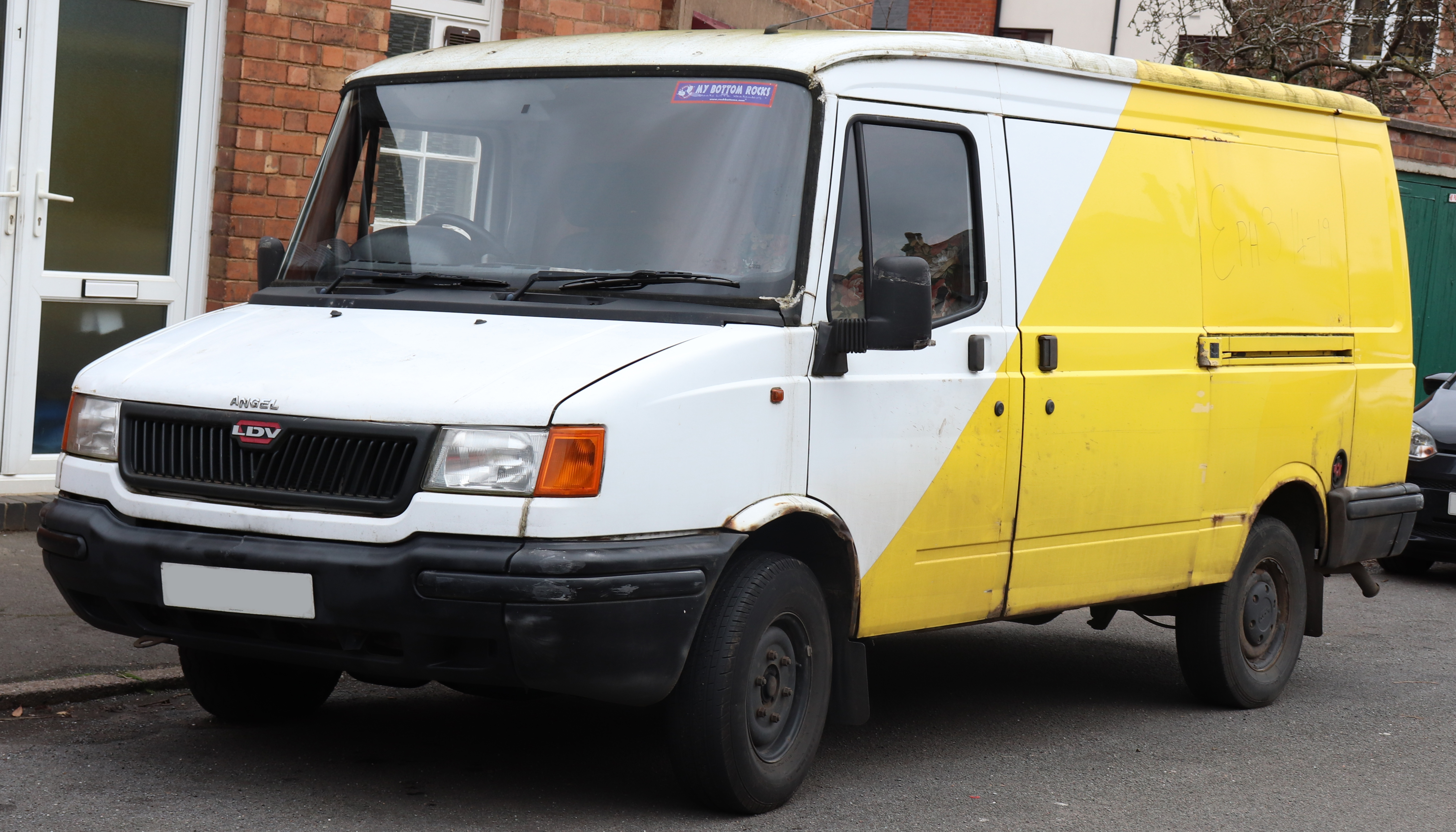
Low-topped LDV Convoy

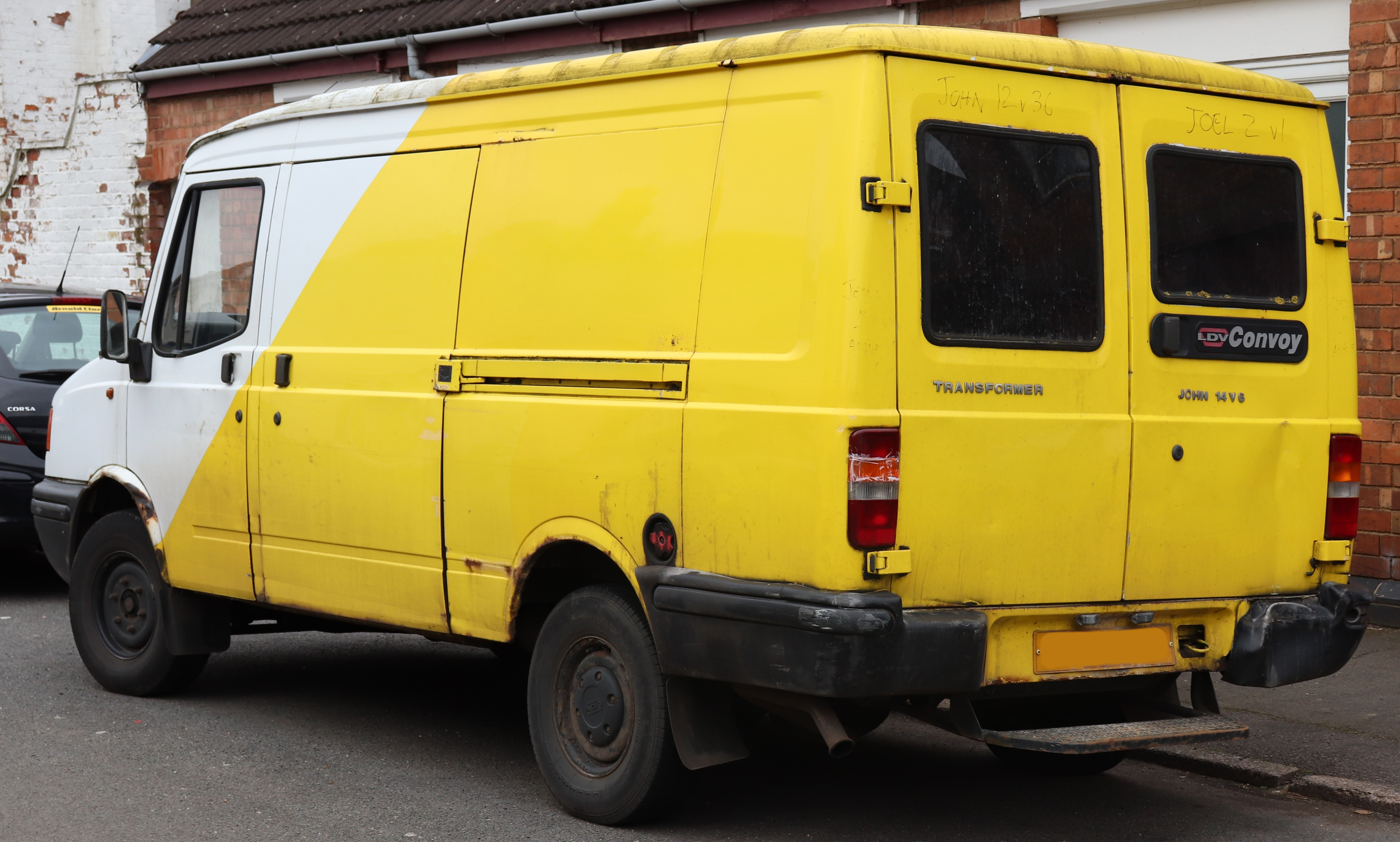
Low-topped LDV Convoy

The van was praised for its 'class-leading' after-sales service and roadside assistance known as 'VANaid' (continuing from the previous 'DAF Aid' program from the previous ownership) operating from a large number of dealers (165 dealers in 1998, many of which were open 24 hours a day, 365 days a year), while sharing parts from the cars mentioned above meant that parts were easy to obtain.

Two years of VANaid and a four-year, 150,000-mile general warranty were standard on most models. All Convoys came with a two-year cosmetic warranty, and a six-year, anti-rust warranty as standard.

==== Retirement ====
By the mid-2000s, however, it was clear that the platform (which harked back to 1974, and relied on some parts from even earlier Austin Morris vans) had run its course, and was now terminally dated in comparison to the competition (by way of comparison, its main rival, the Ford Transit, has had two complete redesigns launched within the lifetime of the entire Sherpa/Freight Rover/Pilot/Convoy series).

Despite upgrades to the drivetrain (replacing the dated York 'banana' engines with the Duratorq units), the van was described as 'hopelessly out of date', 'rubbish', 'old-fashioned', 'ugly', a 'box on wheels', 'geriatric', a 'throwback to a bygone era', and a 'remnant from the 1970s', and that the vehicles 'drove like demented ducks'. Sharing powertrain components such as engines with Peugeots and the Ford Transit was also not ideal for LDV, for which the purchasing of expensive running gear directly from arch rivals hugely dented the profitability of this model.

The last Convoy was built in 2006, succeeded by the Maxus.

==== Awards ====
- What Van 'Best Minibus' 2000
- What Van 'Best Minibus' 2001 (Note: Title on website incorrectly says "Van of the Year 2000 Awards" however everything after that correctly says 2001".)
- What Van 'Best Minibus' 2002
- Prince Michael Road Safety Bus and Truck Award 2000

== See also ==
- LDV Group
- LDV Pilot
- LDV Maxus
