= Unipart =

Manufacturing company in Oxford, England

Unipart Group Limited
- Type: Private
- Industry: Supply chain
- Founded: 1974
- Founder: British Leyland
- Headquarters: Oxford, England
- Key people: Darren Leigh (CEO); Bryan Jackson (Chairman)
- Services: Supply Chain Solutions
- Revenue: £1,081.1 million (2024)
- Number of employees: 11,000 (2024)
- Website: unipart.com

Unipart is a British multinational logistics, supply chain, manufacturing and consultancy company headquartered in Cowley, Oxfordshire, England. It has operations in Europe, North America, Asia Pacific, and the Middle East, and works across a variety of sectors that include automotive, retail, technology and rail. It is one of the largest privately owned companies in the UK; being 70% owned by its workforce and pension fund while the other 30% is held by sympathetic institutions.

Unipart originated in 1969 as a division of the state-owned conglomerate British Leyland (BL), and formally being established as a subsidiary company in 1974. Under the leadership of John Neill, it was demerged via a management buyout from BL's successor, the Rover Group, during 1987. Having initially been a distributor of aftermarket service parts for BL/Rover Group vehicles, Unipart quickly branched out into providing logistical services and other activities on behalf of other vehicle manufacturers, including Honda, Jaguar, and Toyota. During May 1999, Unipart acquired the Partco network and thus became the largest automotive parts distribution business in the UK under the Unipart Automotive branded. Despite this, Unipart gradually transitioned towards other sectors; by the late 2000s, the automotive parts sector only contributed half of its overall turnover. During July 2014, Unipart Automotive went into administration.

Various other sectors of business were entered into during the 1990s and 2000s. During the late 1990s, Unipart backed a management-led buyout team at the formerly state-owned National Railway Supplies, a servicer and distributor of signalling and telecom equipment for the rail industry; this move led to the creation of Unipart Rail. During early 2006, the company finalised a 10-year deal with Vodafone to operate its mobile phone handset repair business. During early 2014, Unipart started work with the University of Huddersfield's Institute of Railway Research to develop The Centre for Innovation in Rail. During the early 2010s, the company secured several multi-year logistics contracts from automotive companies based in both India and China. In March 2015, Unipart announced the launch of a new high-tech engineering and manufacturing business called Unipart Powertrain Applications. In late 2018, Unipart Logistics commenced a five-year £730 million contract with the NHS. For the year ending 2022, the company had a turnover of £917.3 million.

== History ==
=== Early activities ===
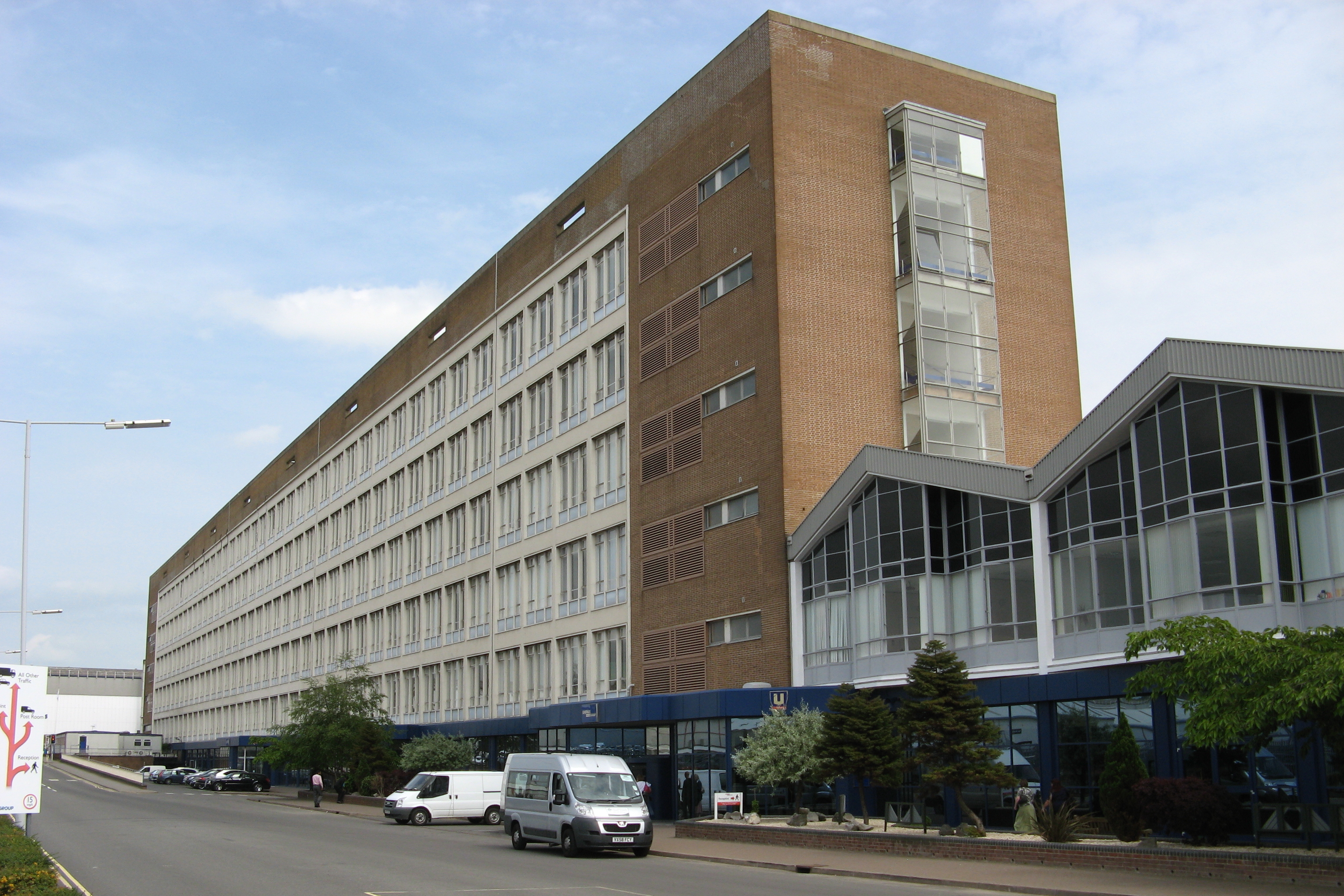
Unipart House, Cowley. Headquarters of Unipart Group, and some subsidiaries.

Unipart was formed in 1969 as the aftermarket parts division of British Leyland (BLMC), under the management of John Egan. The then BLMC chairman Lord Stokes recognised the value of the aftermarket service parts business, pointing to the success of the major three American automakers' equivalent operations - namely Motorcraft (Ford), AC Delco (General Motors) and Mopar (Chrysler).

After a successful spell as a division, Egan ran Unipart as a wholly independent subsidiary company of BLMC from 1974 onwards. The following year, BLMC was effectively nationalised, while Egan left in 1976 to join Massey Ferguson.

Egan was replaced by 29-year-old John Neill, who continued Egan's policy of providing the same logistical services to BL's competitors as well as to its parent. In 1987, shortly after BL had been re-privatised as the Rover Group, Neill led a management buyout of Unipart, in part financed by a wider employee buy-in. External backing for this buyout came from several companies, including Electra, 3i and Standard Life; by 2007, the value of their investment in Unipart had reportedly multiplied 80-fold. By 2005, Unipart was 70% owned by its workforce and pension fund, the other 30% is held by sympathetic institutions; shares in the company were not purchasable by the general public.

Following the buyout, Unipart's main business focus was on distribution and logistics, including the marketing and distribution of automotive products; it also held two manufacturing sites. During 1988, the company secured a contract to produce parts for Honda's factory in Swindon. That same year, Unipart launched its Mark in Action programme, under which employees are periodically selected for a certificate of merit for which they are nominated for by their peers; these scheme is aimed at encouraging all members of staff to make improvements.

During 1994, Unipart exited the factoring sector via the sale of its Edmunds Walker chain to Finelist.

During May 1999, Unipart purchased the Partco network, a distributor of parts in the automotive aftermarket sector, after which Partco was eventually rebranded as Unipart Automotive. The Partco acquisition created the largest automotive parts distribution business in the UK, employing in excess of 10,000 people. In spite of this acquisition and the company's background, Unipart gradually transitioned towards earning revenue in other sectors; by the late 2000s, the automotive parts sector only contributed half of its overall turnover.

In 2000, Unipart suspended dividends to shareholders on account of a significant financial shortfall in its pension fund. Measures to rectify this, which continued for the rest of the decade, including the closure of the pension fund to new employees and a lengthy period without any dividends. Part of the company's poor financial performance at this time was due to the Partco acquisition and resulting litigation actions.

During early 2006, the company announced a 10-year deal with Vodafone to operate its mobile phone handset repair business. By 2007, Unipart was handling logistics for several major British retailers, including Homebase, Boots, and Halfords. In 2009, the firm was chosen by Sky to operate its set-top box repair business, including logistics, recycling services, and fleet management.

=== Divestitures and acquisitions ===
During January 2014, Unipart announced the development of two new manufacturing facilities, one at the Coventry site focused on high-tech fuel system components and one at Kautex Unipart Ltd as part of its partnership with German company Kautex Textron.

In 2014, Vince Cable, the then Secretary of State for Business, Innovation & Skills and the APC (Advanced Propulsion Centre) launched the ACTIVE (Advanced Combustion Turbocharge Inline Variable Valvetrain Engine) project supported by the Automotive Council at Ford's Dunton Technical Centre, focused on the advancement of propulsion development and production. The project included work at 11 partner locations, including Unipart Eberspacher Exhaust Systems.

In April 2014, Unipart announced a five-year logistics contract with Qoros Automotive based in Changshu, China.

During 2014, Unipart Group began working with Andrew Page and the UK Parts Alliance to ensure that British used car owners would continue to be supported via Unipart Car Care Centres, which are based in towns across the UK, and delivered the same standard of service to their customers.

In March 2015, the company announced that it was launching a new high-tech engineering and manufacturing business called Unipart Powertrain Applications.

During May 2015, Unipart announced its biggest rise in profits for 10 years, which it attributed at the time to continued improvements in productivity. That same year, Unipart launched a joint venture with Rolls-Royce called MetLase Limited. MetLase uses high precision, laser cutting technology, and patented assembly and joining systems, to enable engineers to produce prototypes rapidly.

In September 2018, Unipart Logistics was awarded a five-year £730 million contract with the NHS, under which several warehouses across the country, which had been formerly operated by DHL under contract, became Unipart sites. Each site is known by the name Unipart NHS Supply Chain.

=== Automotive sector ===
In 2011, 51% of the Unipart Automotive parts business was sold to H2 Equity Partners while the remaining 49% was retained by Unipart Group. A condition of the sale was that Unipart Group exercised no control over the business. Under its new ownership, Unipart Automotive was granted a restricted licence by Unipart Group to use the Unipart brand on a limited range of wholesale outlets and a tightly controlled range of automotive car parts in the UK.

During 2012, Unipart started a multi-year logistics contract with Toyota's Indian subsidiary covering its Bangalore site. Two years later, the company signed a second distribution contract with Toyota, to expand its management of distribution operations to Kolkata.

In April 2013, H2 sold Sator Holding to Unipart Automotive's main rival Euro Car Parts in exchange for £176 million. During July 2014, Unipart Automotive entered into administration with the loss of more than 1,200 jobs; several branches and 361 staff were moved to Andrew Page and the Parts Alliance.

At the 2013 European Supply Chain Excellence Awards, Unipart was awarded Overall Winner for its management of global aftermarket support of 1.2 million Jaguar Cars. That same year, Unipart also received the Aftermarket Parts logistics trophy at the Automotive Supply Chain Global Awards. Unipart was one of seven organisations worldwide to be awarded both the Sword of Honour and the Globe of Honour by the British Safety Council in 2013 for the second year in a row for its Oxford distribution centre. That year, six Unipart sites received the Sword of Honour award.

=== Rail sector ===
During early 1997, amid the wider privatisation of British Rail, Unipart backed a management-led buyout team at the formerly state-owned National Railway Supplies, a servicer and distributor of signalling and telecom equipment for the rail industry, and thus acquired a minority shareholding in the newly privatised company. Four year later, the company purchased 100 percent of the firm, including its York, Brighton and Crewe locations, after which it was rebranded as Unipart Rail.

During early 2014, Unipart started work with the University of Huddersfield's Institute of Railway Research to develop The Centre for Innovation in Rail. Later that same year, the company announced the creation of a new UK-orientated joint venture with Lucchini RS Group; this venture was named LUR Limited and produced railway wheels and wheelsets along with other activities.

In January 2016, Unipart Rail acquired Park Signalling, a firm specialising in the design and build of signalling, telecoms, control and monitoring equipment on rail networks. In 2017, Unipart Rail acquired Key Fasteners, a supplier of rail industry materials, and a controlling share Instrumentel Ltd., one of the UK's leading technology companies. In 2018, Unipart Logistics and Waterstones agreed to extend their long-term partnership for an additional five years.

During the late 2010s, Unipart Rail pursued external accreditation of its products and services under the Railway Industry Supplier Approval Scheme (RISAS).

In early 2019, Unipart Rail acquired Westcode, a specialist supplier of air supply, HVAC, and door systems active in both the European and North American markets.

In late 2020, Comms Design Ltd, a rail electronics and signalling manufacturer based in Harrogate, was acquired by Unipart.

During March 2024, it was announced that Unipart Rail and Thomson Engineering Ltd had formed a partnership to expand their global rail infrastructure maintenance activities. Specifically, Unipart was appointed as the exclusive sales and distribution partner for Thomson Engineering Design Ltd across Europe, Asia, New Zealand, Australia and North America.

=== Technology sector ===
During early 2006, Unipart announced a 10-year deal with Vodafone to operate its mobile phone handset repair business.

== Corporate affairs ==
Unipart's traditional promotion of its services was by motorsports sponsorship, from 1978 with the Triumph Dolomite Formula 3 team, and from 1980 in Formula One, first with Ensign and then with McLaren until 1983. Once Unipart was completely independent, they returned to Formula One sponsorship, with Tyrrell and later with Jordan Grand Prix.

Unipart has links with the local community and education, supporting community initiatives and organisations. Unipart has a traditionally strong affiliation with motorsport. During 2006, the company teamed up with Nigel Mansell and his sons, Greg and Leo, in a sponsorship deal in support of Nigel's sons' careers in Formula BMW. Unipart has also supported an initiative to give homeless people supported and paid employment.

Unipart has also run the Unipart Inspires initiative aimed at secondary school-aged student under which they attended classes within Unipart daily and are supported through work experience and were treated as trainees, rather than pupils. Specifically, in combines traditional work experience activities with training in job hunting skills such as interview practice, CV writing and using social media to search for jobs.

Unipart has also instituted community programmes that send its engineers into nearby schools to teach problem-solving techniques and its consultants to job centres to increase employability potential. The company has also worked with the long-term unemployed to help find work.

=== The Unipart Way ===
"The Unipart Way" is a system of lean manufacturing tools and techniques, with a guiding philosophy to reduce waste or activities which do not add value. Based on the company's learning from Honda and study into the Toyota Production System, it is the name the company has given to its methodology. It involves a process of continuous measurement which is designed to lead to a reduction of wasteful activity, thereby ensuring the best deployment of time and resources.

The methodology has been implemented in public institutions, including Sherwood Forest Hospitals NHS Foundation Trust where a partnership with Unipart helped the healthcare provider earn an award as the most improved healthcare employer in the UK.

=== Unipart U ===
In 1993, the company founded Unipart U to provide training to shop floor workers and managers. By 1998, Unipart U offered 180 courses for employees and had two main facilities, Learning Curve, a resource centre and Leading Edge, a training centre for new technologies. In 2000, the company invested £1.5 million to create a computerized training courses named 'Virtual U' and available on shop floors for its employees.

In 2014, Unipart announced a £32m joint venture with Coventry University called The Institute for Advanced Manufacturing and Engineering, located at Unipart's manufacturing site in Coventry. The program received £7.9 million in funding from the Higher Education Funding Council and was also backed by George Osborne. Construction began on the Institute in April 2014.

The Institute opened in 2015. As part of the partnership, 60 students at Coventry University divide their time between lecture halls and Unipart's manufacturing site.
