= Kevin Morley =

Kevin Thomas Morley (born May 1950), is a Liverpool born businessman, known for being the former managing director, sales and marketing of the former Rover Group.

Holding an MSc from the University of Surrey and Master of Business Administration from Aston University, Morley joined Ford UK in 1977, and during a nine-year career achieved 11 promotions.

Morley joined the Austin Rover Group in 1986 as marketing director under Canadian Graham Day, where his first project was the Rover 200 Mk2/R8 in 1989. Morley was appointed managing director, sales and marketing of the Rover Car Group five years later, the company had a turnover of £3.2 billion and a staff of 1100. In 1991, Morley appeared in Rowan Atkinson's mockumentary, The Driven Man, speaking about the relationship people have with the car as a construct.

After leaving Rover in 1992, Morley set up Kevin Morley Marketing, whose sole client was Rover Group. Having described the motor marketing as a "bunch of expensive lunch-bandits," in 1995 Morley sold the company to Lintas.

Morley has been a director of dfs Plc, Flying Flowers, Jacobs Holdings; and founding member of the Advisory Board of Jon Moulton's Venture Capital company Alchemy Partners.

Morley is a Chairman of several private companies, and Senior non-executive director of Stadium Group.He became chairman and head of Young Driver in 2009 and appeared both on the television and radio promoting it.

Morley is Honorary Professor of Business Studies at University of Warwick.

In March 2009, Morley appeared on Channel 4's reality television show Secret Millionaire, where working as a volunteer among community projects in Haringey, north London, he donated £250,000.

Married with two children, Morley and his family live in Slinfold, Horsham. He currently drives cars such as the Porsche Macan S and BMW Alpina D3 S Touring Estate.
