= Freight Rover =

British automobile manufacturer

- Industry: Automotive
- Founded: January 1981
- Defunct: April 1987
- Successor: Leyland DAF
- Headquarters: Washwood Heath, Birmingham, England
- Products: Vans
- Parent: British Leyland (1981-86); Rover Group (1986-87)

Freight Rover was a British light commercial vehicle manufacturer and originally part of British Leyland (BLMC/BL) and later the Rover Group which existed from 1981 to 1987, and was based in the Washwood Heath area of Birmingham, England. The company had its origins in the Austin-Morris division of BLMC and its sole product was the Sherpa family of light panel vans, which ultimately evolved into the LDV Pilot and Convoy models.

== History ==
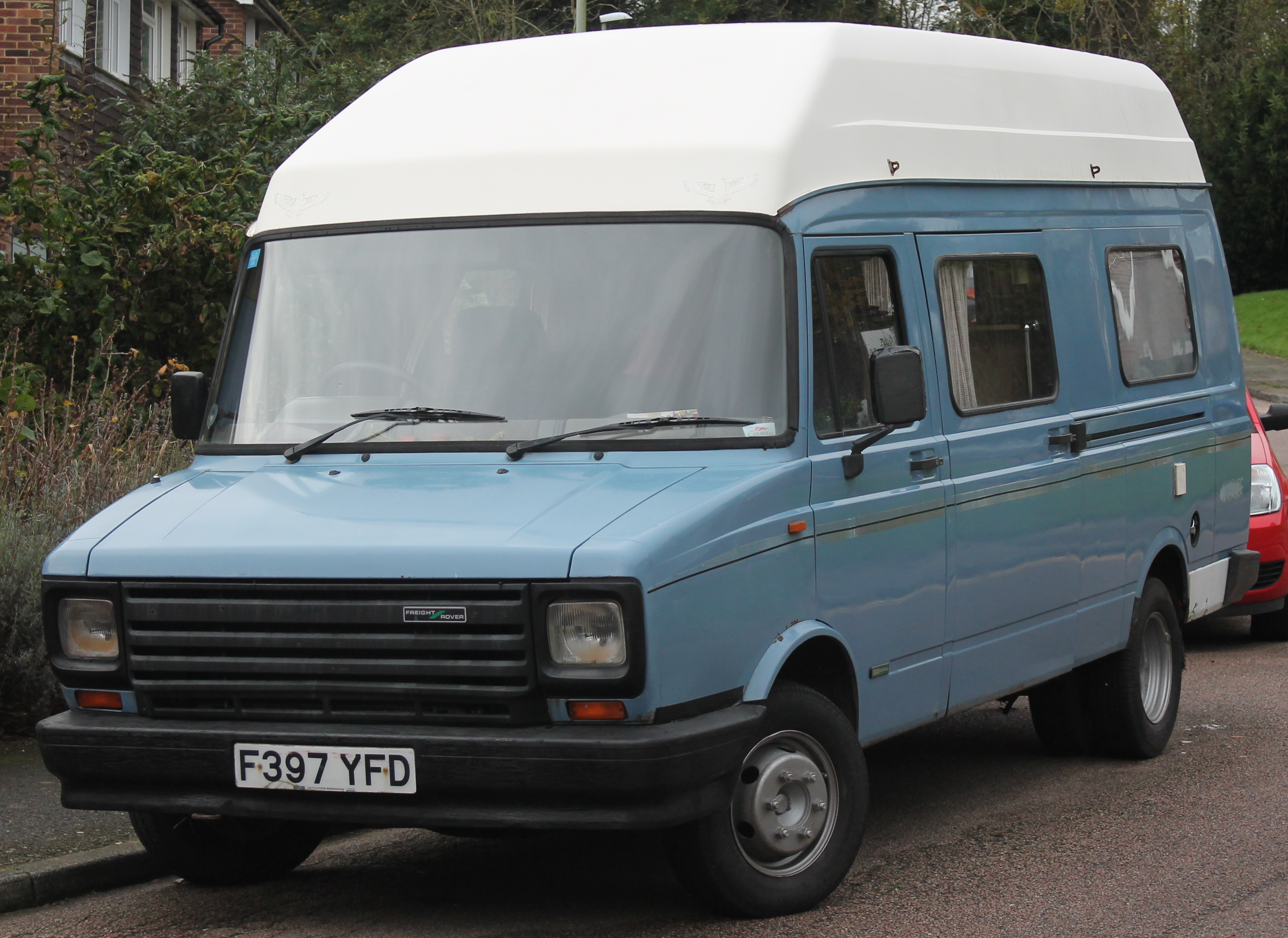
Freight Rover Sherpa

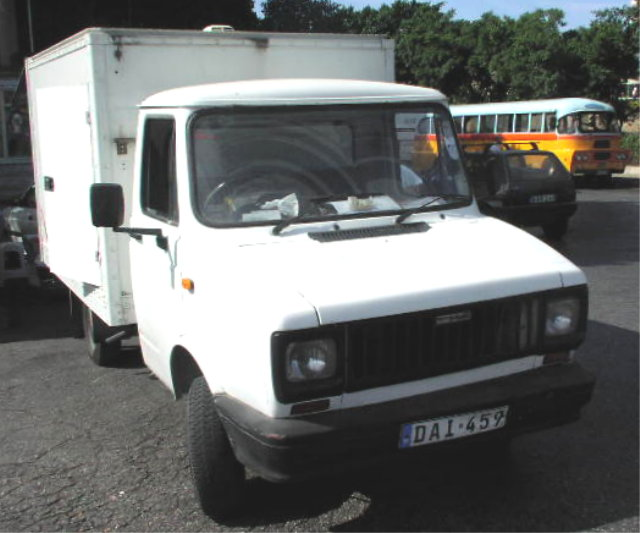
Freight Rover Box Van

Freight Rover was created as a division of the Land Rover Group of British Leyland (BL) in 1981, creating a new single brand for BL's light commercial vehicle range, which had previously been sold under the Leyland and Austin-Morris brands (although car derived vans such as those based on the Morris Ital and Austin Metro continued to be sold under either the Austin or Morris brands). Essentially, Freight Rovers were face-lifted, badge engineered versions of the first generation Leyland Sherpa.

Under later restructuring, Freight Rover became part of the Leyland Trucks division of BL. Following the renaming of BL in 1986 to Rover Group, the Leyland Trucks division merged with the Dutch truck company DAF Trucks in 1987 to form DAF NV, which in the UK traded as Leyland DAF and which was later floated on the Dutch stock market. The new company had three plants: a truck plant in each of Eindhoven and Leyland, and the van plant in Washwood Heath. Following the collapse of DAF NV in 1993, the van plant was the subject of a management buyout and a new independent van company, LDV Group, was established.

== Vehicles ==
- Sherpa/200 Series
- 300 Series
