= Ford York engine =

Inline diesel engine in vehicles

The Ford York engine is an inline diesel engine manufactured by Ford used in vehicles including the Ford Transit range of vans between 1972 and 2000.

== Applications ==
The Transit was fitted with a 2.5-litre four-cylinder engine, but the engine was also available as a 3.5-litre six-cylinder engine. These were fitted in the Ford A series of light commercial vehicles. The York engine superseded the Perkins 4.108 IDI engine.

Both the four-and six-cylinder engines were also used as industrial engines. The front of the crankshaft had a long section with a key to allow a full-power front power take-off.

== Characteristics ==
The 4-cylinder engine produced 45.7 kilowatts (61.3 bhp), and the 6-cylinder had an output of 64.9 kilowatts (87.0 bhp) at 3,600 rpm. The torque of the 4-cylinder was 13.7 kilogram metres (99 lb⋅ft); the 6-cylinder had 19.14 kilogram metres (138.4 lb⋅ft) of torque, both at 2250 rpm.

Both engines had the same bore and stroke, 93.67 mm × 85.58 mm (3.688 in × 3.369 in). The compression ratio was 22:1, and the timing was belt driven.

The material of both the block and cylinder head was cast iron. The cylinder head was of the cross-flow type and had interchangeable valve seats, with the valves vertically placed and operated via pushrods by a camshaft that was low placed in the block. Lubrication was provided by a double-rotor pump with a capacity of 65 litres per minute at 2,460 rpm.

Fuel delivery was by mechanical pump operating at a peak pressure of 350 bars (5,100 psi).

The cold start of the first generation was a heating element in the intake manifold, and ether injection operated by the driver introduced in 1977. The later 4-cylinder versions had more modern glowplugs as a cold start system.

== Succession ==
The engine was redesigned in 1984 at a cost of £100 million, becoming the Ford 2.5 DI engine. The block shared the same cylinder spacing and 93.67 mm (3.69 in) bore, allowing production in the same facility and use of the improved block as a service part for the older engine. The front PTO was discontinued and replaced by a harmonically balanced crankshaft pulley to reduce engine noise. The 2.5 DI was launched in mainland Europe some months before being introduced in the United Kingdom, due to much greater demand for diesel engines in that market at the time.
