= Rover Group =

Former British automotive company

The Rover Group Limited
- Industry: Automobiles
- Predecessor: British Leyland
- Founded: 1986; 40 years ago
- Defunct: May 2000; 26 years ago
- Fate: Split, MG and Rover sold to Phoenix Venture Holdings for a nominal £10 to create MG Rover Group, Land Rover sold to Ford for £1.8 billion, Mini retained by BMW.
- Successors: MG Rover Group; BMW (UK) Holdings Limited (legal successor)
- Headquarters: Longbridge, Birmingham, England, UK
- Key people: Graham Day (CEO, Chairman); Kevin Morley (Director); John Towers (Rover Group Executive)
- Products: Motor vehicles
- Brands: Rover; Austin; Land Rover (until 2000); Freight Rover (until 1987); MG; Sterling; Leyland (until 1987); Mini (until 2000)
- Parent: British Leyland (1986–1987); British Aerospace (1988–1994); BMW (1994–2000)
- Subsidiaries: Leyland Vehicles (until 1987); Unipart (until 1987); Austin Rover (until 1989)

The Rover Group plc was the British vehicle manufacturing conglomerate known as "BL plc" until 1986 (formerly British Leyland), which had been a state-owned company since 1975. It initially included the Austin Rover Group car business (comprising the Austin, Rover, Mini and MG marques), Land Rover Group, Freight Rover vans and Leyland Trucks. The Rover Group also owned the dormant trademarks from the many companies that had merged into British Leyland and its predecessors such as Triumph, Morris, Wolseley, Riley and Alvis.

The Rover Group was owned by British Aerospace (BAe) from 1988 to 1994 when BAe sold the remaining car business of Rover Group plc to the German company BMW. The group was later broken up in 2000, when Ford acquired the Land Rover division, with the Rover and MG marques continuing with the much smaller MG Rover Group until 2005. Ownership of the original Rover Group marques is currently split between BMW (Germany), SAIC (China), and Tata Motors (India), the latter owning the Rover marque itself with its subsidiary Jaguar Land Rover owning much of the assets of the historic Rover company.

== History ==
The Rover Group plc was formed by renaming BL plc in 1986, soon after the appointment by Margaret Thatcher of Canadian Graham Day to the position of chairman and managing director of BL.

After divesting of its commercial vehicle manufacturing, bus manufacturing and the spares and logistics manufacturing divisions (Leyland Trucks and Freight Rover to DAF to form DAF NV (which traded as Leyland DAF in the UK), Leyland Bus to a management buyout (albeit short-lived as it would be purchased by Volvo in 1988) and Unipart to a management buyout led by John Neill), the company then consisted of the car manufacturing arm Austin Rover Group and the Land Rover Group. This group was privatised in 1988 by the sale of the company to British Aerospace (BAe) for £150 million, who retained Day as joint CEO and chairman, and made Kevin Morley MD of Rover cars.

The group changed its name again in 1989 to Rover Group Holdings Limited, whilst the car manufacturing subsidiary Austin Rover Group Limited shortened its name to Rover Group Limited. By this time, only the Rover, Land Rover and MG brands were still active – Austin had already been dropped in 1987, because it was felt by Graham Day's new management that many of the other marque names within the former BL had been tarnished by their association with the poor quality cars of the 1970s.

The strategy going forward, therefore, was to concentrate on the upmarket Rover brand instead. Two vehicles originally badged as Austins, the Montego saloon and Maestro hatchback, became "marque-less" with bonnet badges the same shape as the Rover longship badge but without "Rover" written on them. Instead any badging just showed the model of the car. When the Austin Metro was facelifted for the 1990 model year, it was rebadged as the Rover Metro.

On 31 January 1994, BAe sold its 80% stake in the company on to German vehicle manufacturer BMW for £800 million (a takeover which caused uproar in the House of Commons), the name changing again in 1995 to BMW (UK) Holdings Limited. The Japanese manufacturer Honda, who owned the remaining 20% stake, terminated the long-standing alliance with BL/Rover which had been in existence since 1980 and also sold its shares to BMW a month later, although the licensing agreements surrounding the manufacture of the collaboratively developed Rover 200, 400, 600, and 800 models remained in place.

Millions of pounds of investment by BMW failed to turn the company into profit. It has been estimated that the entire Rover bankruptcy cost BMW fifteen billion Marks. In March 2000, BMW announced it planned to sell the Rover Group. Following bids from Alchemy Partners and Phoenix Consortium, the MG division, including a collection of dormant marques and the intellectual property rights and technical designs of MG and Rover-branded vehicles as well as the Longbridge plant were sold to the Phoenix Consortium, led by John Towers, an ex-Rover Group executive. BMW retained the historic Morris Motors assembly plant in Cowley and the Pressed Steel plant in Swindon to build the forthcoming new Mini family of vehicles, which had been developed at Longbridge by Rover Group and were due for launch within a year. Land Rover and the Solihull assembly plant were sold to Ford Motor Company, becoming part of Ford's Premier Automotive Group, ultimately reuniting it with Jaguar which had been divested from British Leyland in 1984 and purchased by Ford in 1989.

=== Subsequent developments ===
All remaining Rover volume production at Cowley (essentially now just the Rover 75 as the Rover 600/800 ranges had already been discontinued by this point), was moved to Longbridge, as BMW demolished the Cowley and Swindon plants before starting construction of Plant Oxford, the new home of Mini production. Much smaller than its predecessors, the MG Rover Group struggled as it continued the heritage of building cars at the Longbridge plant. Adhering to UK regulations, BMW guaranteed that Phoenix Venture Holdings (initially named MG Rover Holdings) would have enough money to keep MG Rover Group in business for at least 3 years following the sale. The agreed "dowry" from BMW included a £427million interest-free loan and stocks of cars. MG Rover's short-term plan was to expand the MG range with sporting versions of existing Rovers, introduce new versions of the Rover 25, 45 and 75 models, reengineer and redesign the MG F, and eventually replace the entire model range with new cars developed through a joint venture with another carmaker.

The MG Rover range initially consisted of five cars: the classic Mini, Rover 25, Rover 45, Rover 75 and MG F along with car-derived van derivatives of the 25. The Mini was only built under temporary license during the first five months of MG Rover's existence. In 2001, the MG ZR, MG ZS and MG ZT (based on the Rover 25, Rover 45 and Rover 75 respectively) are launched as sporting alternatives to the standard Rover models. The range further expanded in 2003 with the launch of the smallest model, the Indian-built CityRover, built as part of a venture with TATA, the Rover Streetwise, a restyled version of the Rover 25 with SUV-like styling, and a flagship model, the MG XPower SV, based on the Qvale Mangusta.

Although the new company owned the intellectual property rights for MG and Rover-branded vehicles, including the Rover 75 that was developed under BMW ownership, the Rover marque was a property licensed from BMW. The rights to the Riley and Triumph marques, along with former Rover Group trademarks Metro and Maxi, were also strategically retained by BMW, as it believed these names are associated with the heritage of sports saloon car manufacturers, or with the heritage of Mini. MG Rover's best year for car sales was their first full year of business, in 2001 – when they sold over 170,000 cars.

Following the collapse of a proposed venture with Malaysian carmaker Proton, in June 2004 Shanghai Automotive Industry Corporation signed a joint venture partnership to develop new models and technologies with MG Rover, with the projection to produce up to a million cars a year, with the production shared between the Longbridge site and locations in China. MG Rover sold parts of Longbridge to St. Modwen Properties for £57.5M in a lease-back deal.

SAIC were to have a 70% stake in this company in return for a £1 billion investment, with MG Rover owning the remaining 30%. However, the National Development and Reform Commission held the opinion that if BMW could not make a success of Rover, then it would be hard for SAIC to do so. Although the joint venture was not yet finalized, MG Rover sold the rights to manufacture Rover's 25 and 75 models and the Powertrain Ltd business to SAIC for £67M, to help keep the business afloat in the face of falling sales.

After MG Rover Group's financial crisis and talks of acquisition or investment by Shanghai Automotive Industry Corporation (SAIC) failed in early 2005, the MG Rover Group suspended production and went into receivership on 7 April 2005. Following liquidation, Nanjing Automobile Corporation bought the rights to the MG marque, and the leftover assets of MG Rover. A 33-year deal was signed in February 2006 between Nanjing Auto and St. Modwen Properties covering the lease of 105 acres (a quarter of the total area of the Longbridge plant) but including the two main car assembly plants, the paint shop and administrative offices at a rent of around £1.8 million a year. In December 2007, Nanjing and SAIC announced their merger, which reunited some of the marques that had formed Rover Group, and ownership of the Longbridge plant became a SAIC controlled facility.

Despite BMW agreeing to sell the Rover marque to SAIC, Ford bought the rights to the Rover name from BMW for approximately £6 million. As part of its purchase of Land Rover from BMW, Ford had acquired an option of first refusal to buy the Rover brand name if MG Rover Group ceased trading. Ford thus reunited the original Rover Company marques, primarily for brand-protection reasons. When Ford's Jaguar and Land Rover businesses were sold to TATA Motors in 2008, Rover, along with the historically prestigious Daimler and Lanchester marques were transferred to TATA Motors.

=== Timeline ===
- 1986: BL plc renamed as The Rover Group plc
  Rover SD1 production ceases after 10 years and the car is replaced by a new model called the Rover 800 – the result of a joint venture with Honda which led to the manufacture of that model and the Honda Legend
- 1987: The Leyland Trucks division (which by then included Freight Rover) merged with DAF to become DAF NV (which in the UK traded as Leyland DAF) with DAF Beheer holding 60%, Rover Group would hold 40%, floating in 1989. DAF NV had three plants; two truck plants in Eindhoven and Leyland and a van plant in Washwood Heath. DAF NV was declared bankrupt in 1993 and was split into three independent companies; the truck plant in Eindhoven resumed trading as DAF Trucks, the truck plant in Leyland resumed trading as Leyland Trucks and the van plant in Washwood Heath became LDV and continued trading until 2009. Both truck plants would be acquired by Paccar in 1996 and 1998 respectively
  Unipart spare parts division sold in a management buyout
  The Austin marque is shelved and the remaining models, the Metro, Maestro and Montego continue without a brand name until the Metro was relaunched as a Rover in 1990
- 1988: Leyland Bus sold to Volvo Buses
  Rover Group privatised; sold to British Aerospace
  fastback version of the Rover 800 launches
- 1989: The volume car manufacturing subsidiary Austin Rover Group Ltd shortens its name to Rover Group Ltd following the shelving of the Austin brand two years earlier.
  The new Rover 200 goes on sale, abandoning the four-door saloon bodystyle in favour of a three and five-door hatchback, the former to launch later. It is also sold as the Honda Concerto. Production of both the Maestro and Montego is scaled down as a result
- 1990: The Rover 400 – saloon version of the Rover 200 – goes on sale. Also going into production is the heavily updated Metro, which features modernised body styling, a reworked interior and a new range of engines. A GTi model replaces the MG version. A three-door Rover 200 also launches
- 1991: The Rover 800 receives a major facelift.
  The MG versions of the Maestro and Montego are discontinued
- 1992: Cabriolet and coupe versions of the Rover 200 are launched. A coupe version of the Rover 800 also launches
- 1993: The Rover 600 is launched, based on the Honda Accord but restyled and using a mixture of Honda and Rover's own engines
- 1994:
  31 January – British Aerospace announces the sale of its 80% majority share of Rover Group to BMW
  21 February – Honda announces it is selling its 20% share of Rover Group to BMW, causing major problems in Rover's supply chain which was reliant on Honda
  An estate version of the Rover 400 called the Tourer is launched, along with an updated Metro which sees the 14-year-old nameplate shelved and rebadged as the Rover 100.
  Production of both the Maestro and Montego ends.
- 1995: Rover Group Holdings plc renamed as BMW (UK) HOLDINGS LIMITED
  New versions of the Rover 200 and Rover 400 go on sale, though this time they are entirely different cars. The Rover 400 is a reworked, upmarket version of the latest Honda Civic, despite the Rover-Honda collaboration finishing a year earlier. The new MG F goes on sale, bringing back the MG badge on a mass-production sports car for the first time since 1980
- 1996: A saloon version of the new Rover 400 launches
- 1997: Production of the Rover 100 ends
- 1998: The Rover 75 is launched as a successor to both the Rover 600 and Rover 800 and goes on sale the following year.
  The cabriolet and coupe versions of the previous Rover 200 and the Tourer estate version of the previous Rover 400 end production, as does the Rover 800
- 1999: The Rover 200 and Rover 400 are facelifted and rebadged as the Rover 25 and Rover 45 respectively
  Production of the Rover 600 ends
- 2000: BMW retains both the Mini marque and the Cowley plant; launches the new Mini. Sales would begin in Summer 2001.
  Land Rover (including the Solihull plant) sold by BMW to Ford for £1.8 billion.
  Remainder of the company (including MG, Rover and the Longbridge plant) sold by BMW to Phoenix Venture Holdings for a nominal £10 and becomes the MG Rover Group

== Models ==
=== Rover 800 series ===
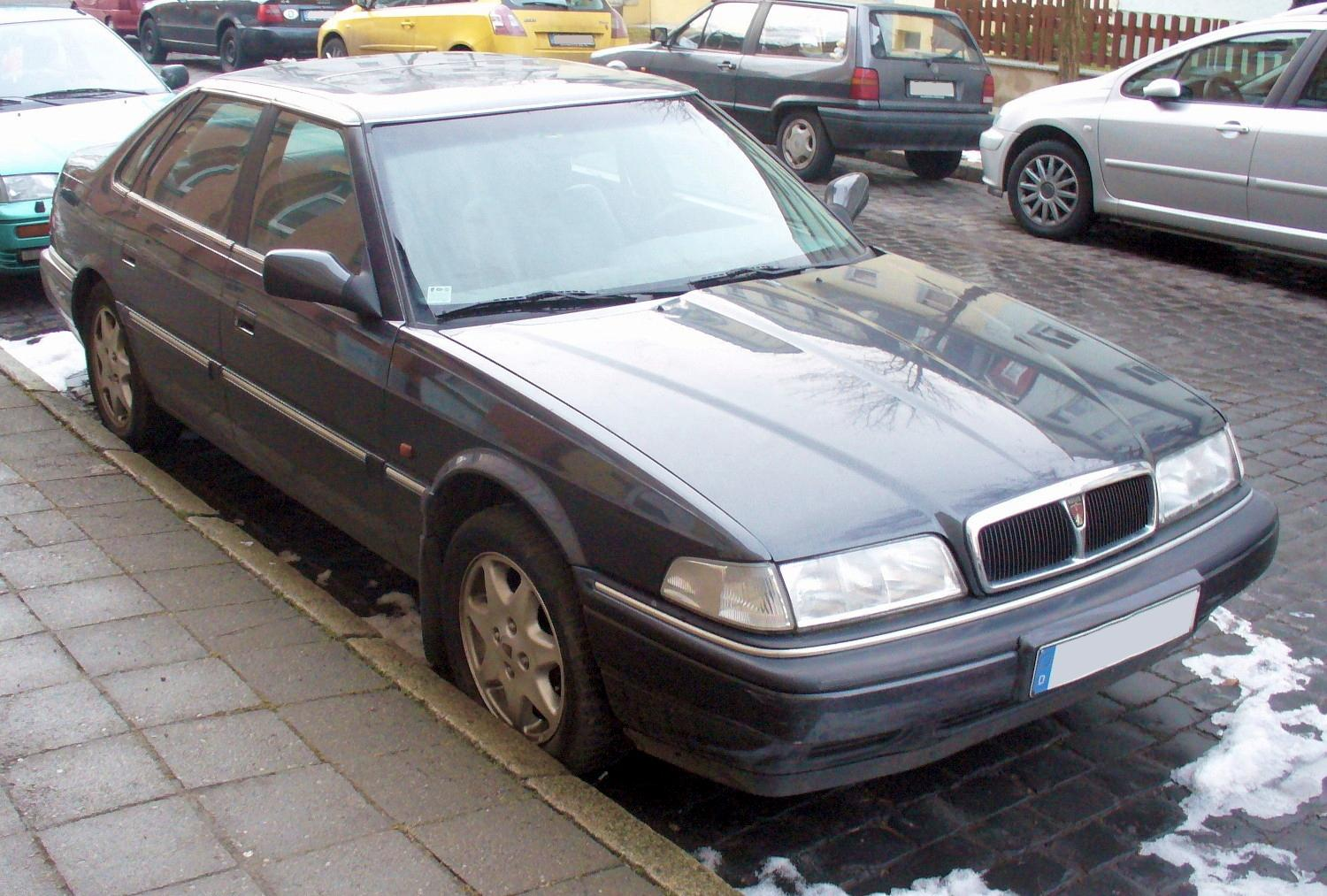
Rover 820

Although the Rover 800 went on sale shortly after BL plc changed its name to Rover Group in July 1986, it had been developed in conjunction with Honda (whose corresponding model was the Legend). It was initially available as a saloon with a fastback version launching in 1988. It sold well among buyers in the executive market, with a facelift in November 1991 and the introduction of a coupe version a few months later. However, it stagnated after a replacement targeted for the 1992 model year was cancelled. Many of its duties as a flagship were performed by the 600. The 800 series was updated again in 1996 which gave the car a chrome and silver grille and a lot more standard kit. By its demise in 1999, it was looking considerably dated and was replaced with the 75.

=== Rover 200 series ===
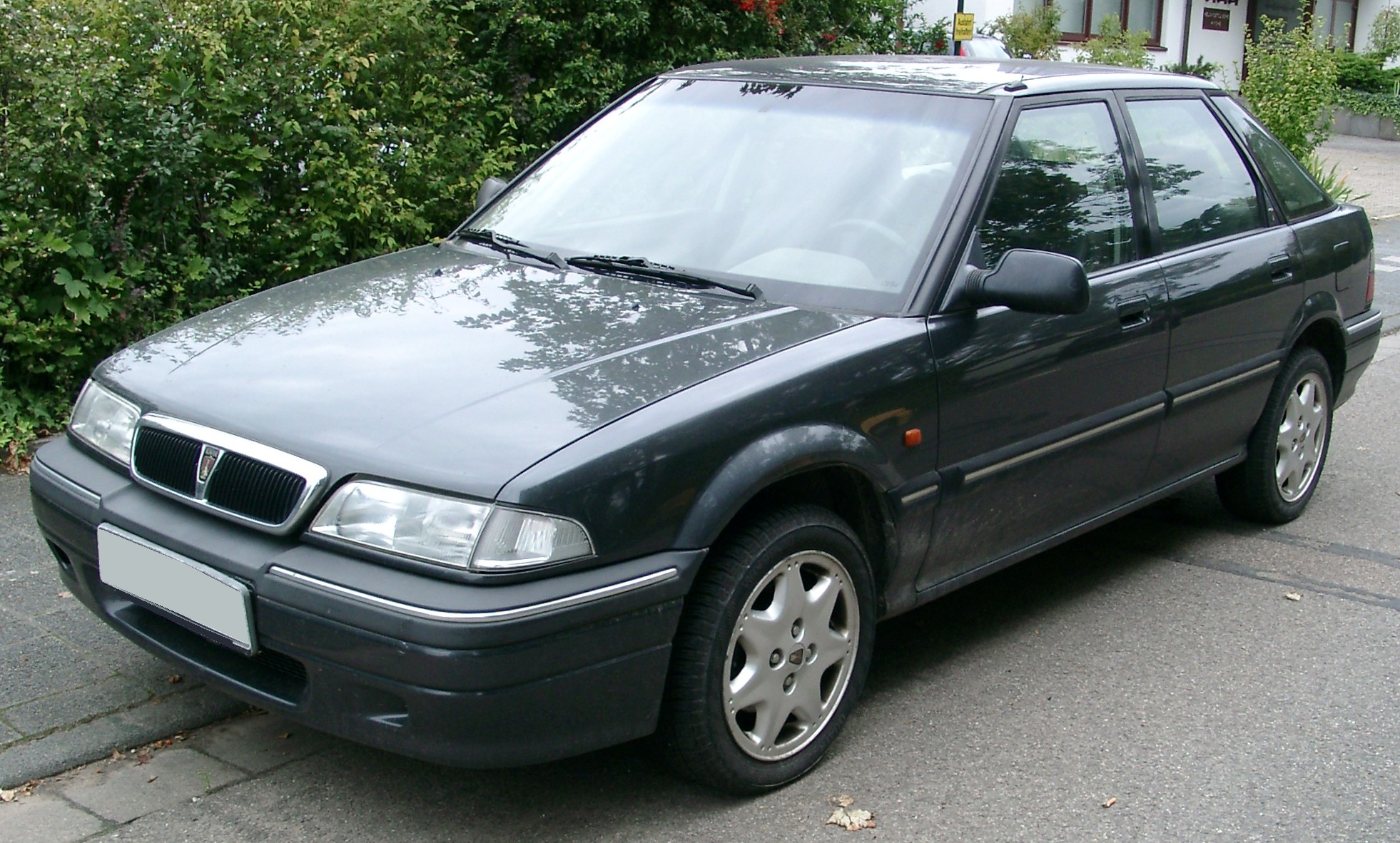
Rover 200 (1989–1995)

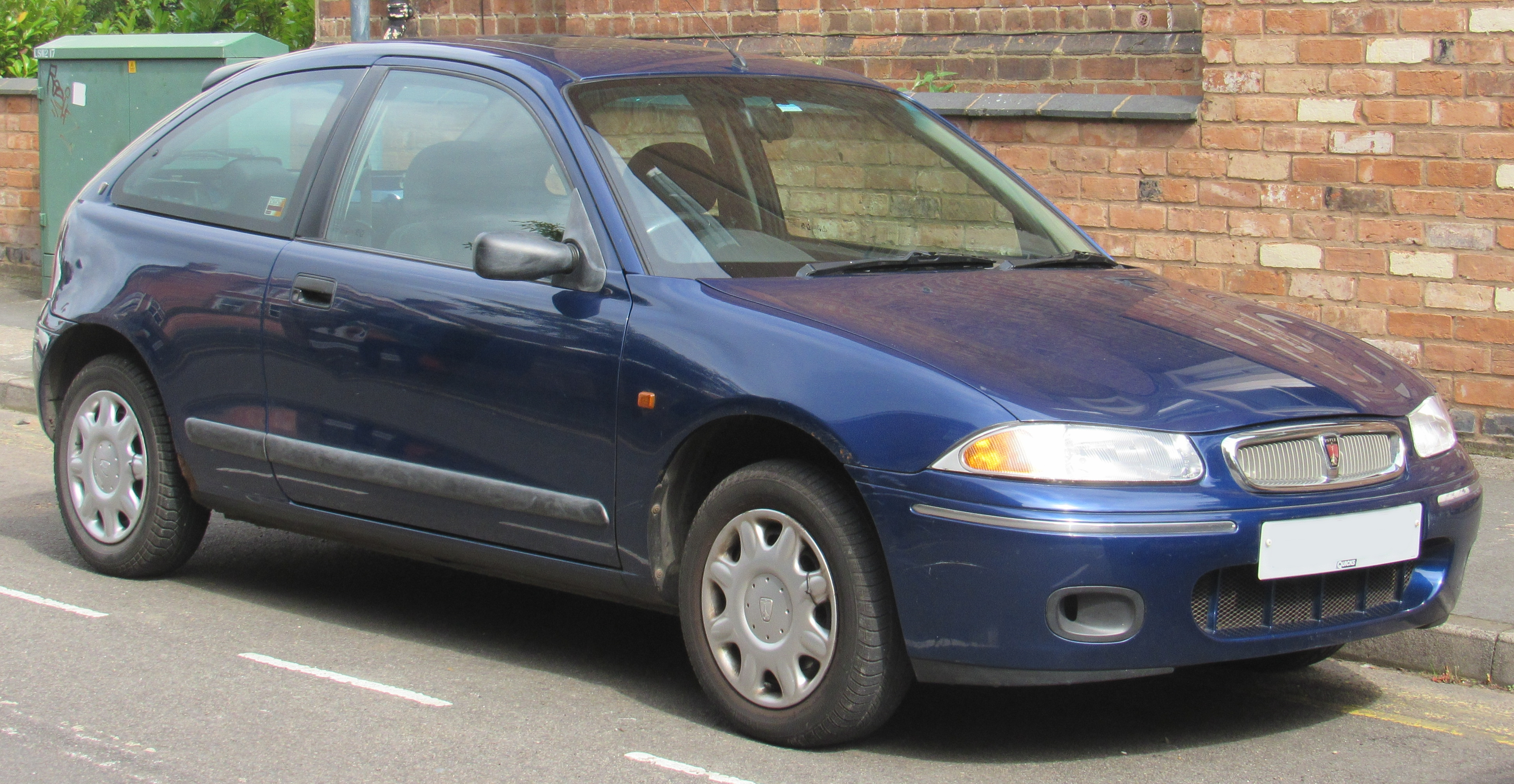
Rover 200 (1995–1999)

The Rover Group's first significant new car launch was the Rover 200, which was introduced in October 1989. Unlike its predecessor, it was a three or five-door hatchback, the former to launch later, instead of a four-door saloon which would become the Rover 400. It used a new range of 16-valve K Series petrol engines as well as a Peugeot 1.9 diesel and 1.8 turbodiesel both fitted to the Phase 1 Peugeot 405. Sales were stronger than its successors and its launch coincided with a winding-down in production of the similarly sized Maestro, which finally ceased production at the end of 1994 having spent the final years of its life as a budget alternative to the more upmarket Rover 200. Coupe and cabriolet versions of the 200 were later launched in 1992 and these were sold alongside the all-new 1995 model and continued until that model was upgraded to become the Rover 25 in 1999. The 1989 Rover 200 was a strong seller throughout its life and its successor continued this trend, though its final year of production (1999) saw a significant dip in sales. These strong sales were not as high as the ever-popular Ford Escort and Vauxhall Astra. The Rover 200 had been around since 1988 as the Longbridge-built Honda Concerto, which offered a higher level of equipment but only achieved a fraction of its sales.

=== Rover 400 series ===
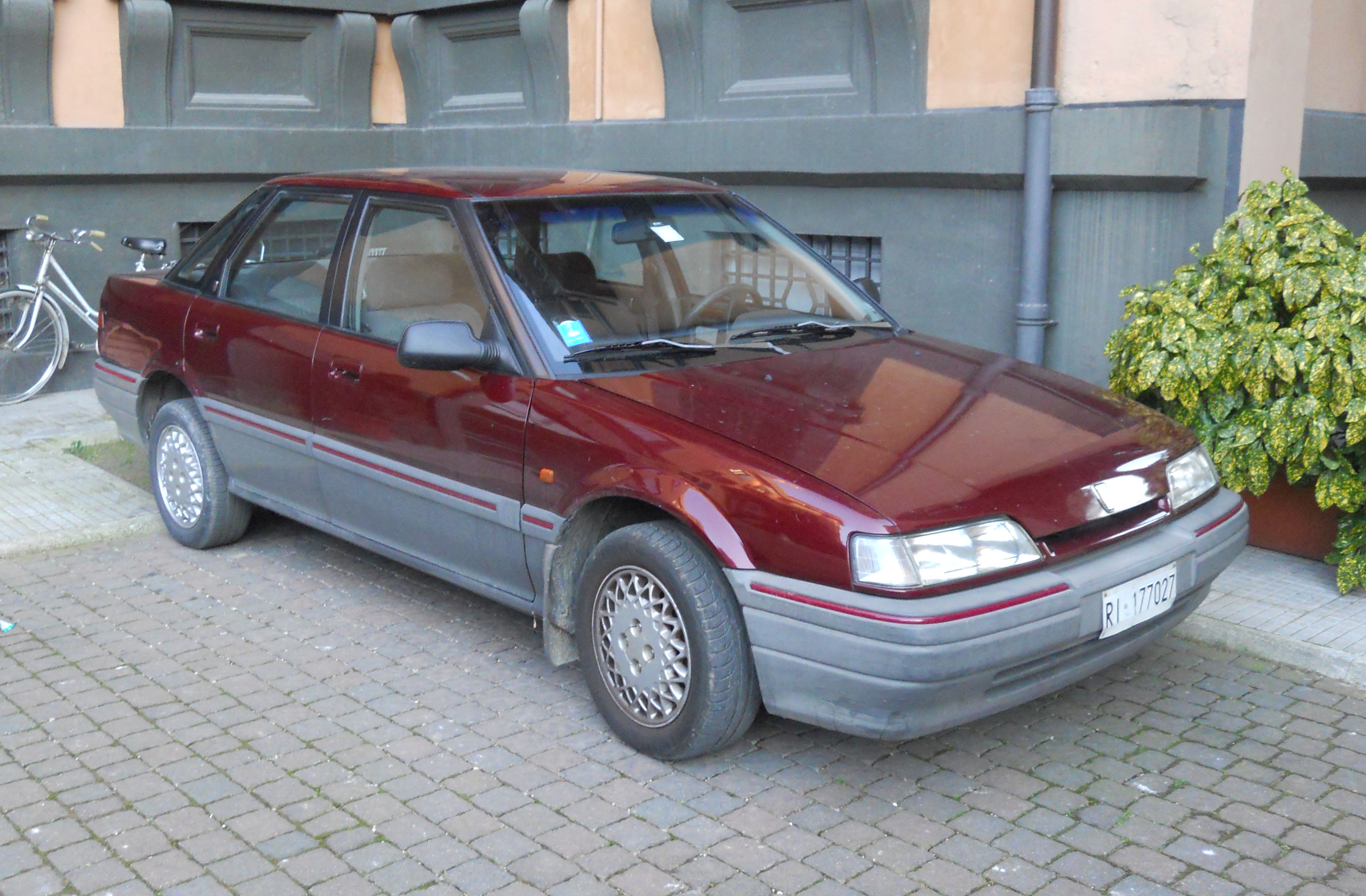
Rover 400 (1990–1995)

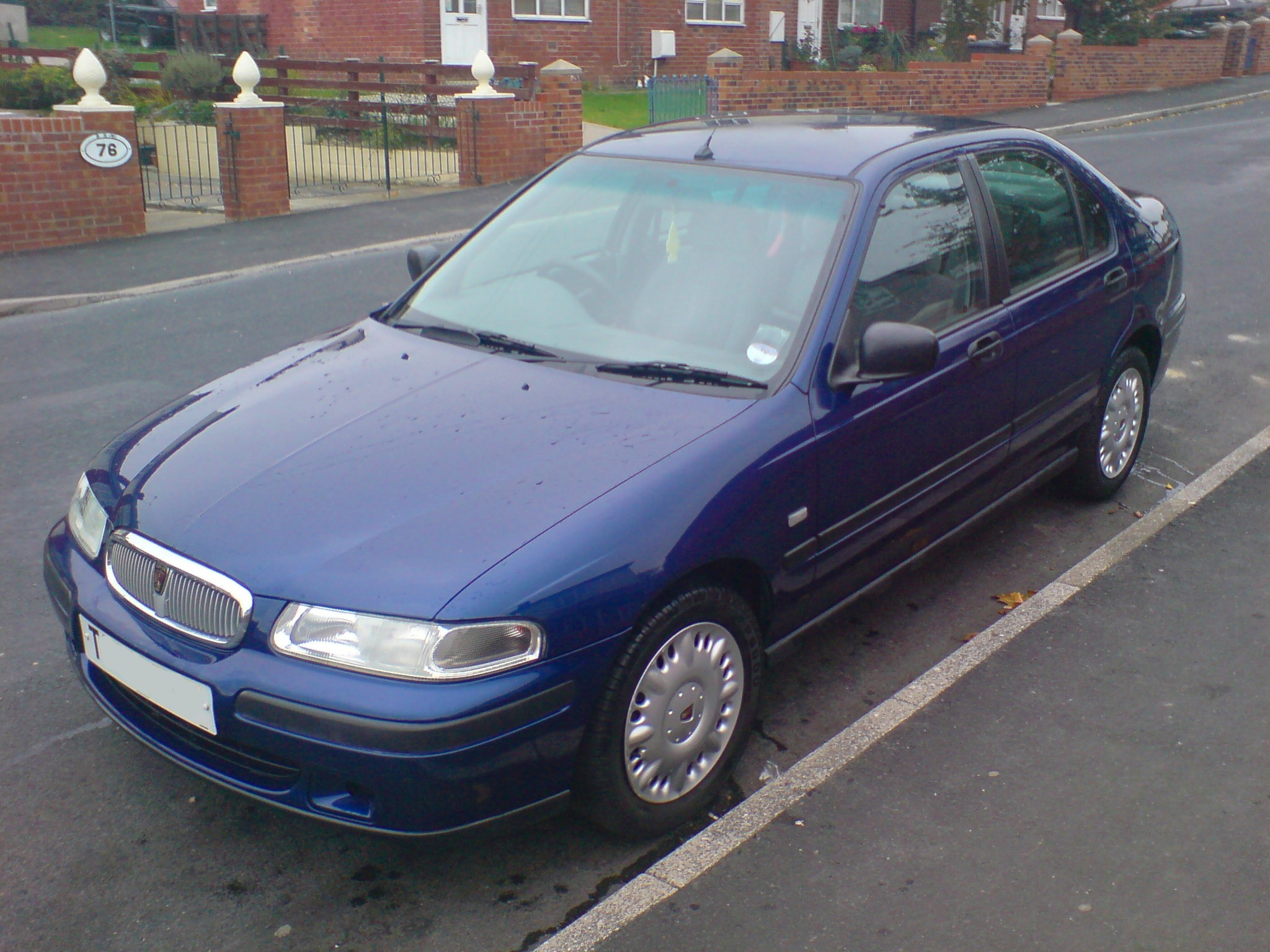
Rover 400 (1995–1999)

In April 1990, Rover launched the Rover 400 range. The 400 was essentially a four-door version of the 200 hatchback, but was slightly longer and offered more storage space. It also replaced the saloon version of the previous 200. It was sold as an alternative to the likes of the Ford Sierra and Vauxhall Cavalier, but was never able to match the success of these cars. An estate version of the 400 was launched in 1994 called the Tourer and continued alongside the all-new Honda Civic-based model that was launched the following year. The 1995 Rover 400 was a more substantial and popular alternative to other large family cars than its successor was, offering impressive equipment levels, but a relative shortage of interior space because it was nearer in size to cars in the next category down. The Rover 400 was facelifted in 1999 to become the Rover 45, and at the same time the estate version of the original 400 was dropped.

=== Rover Metro/Rover 100 ===
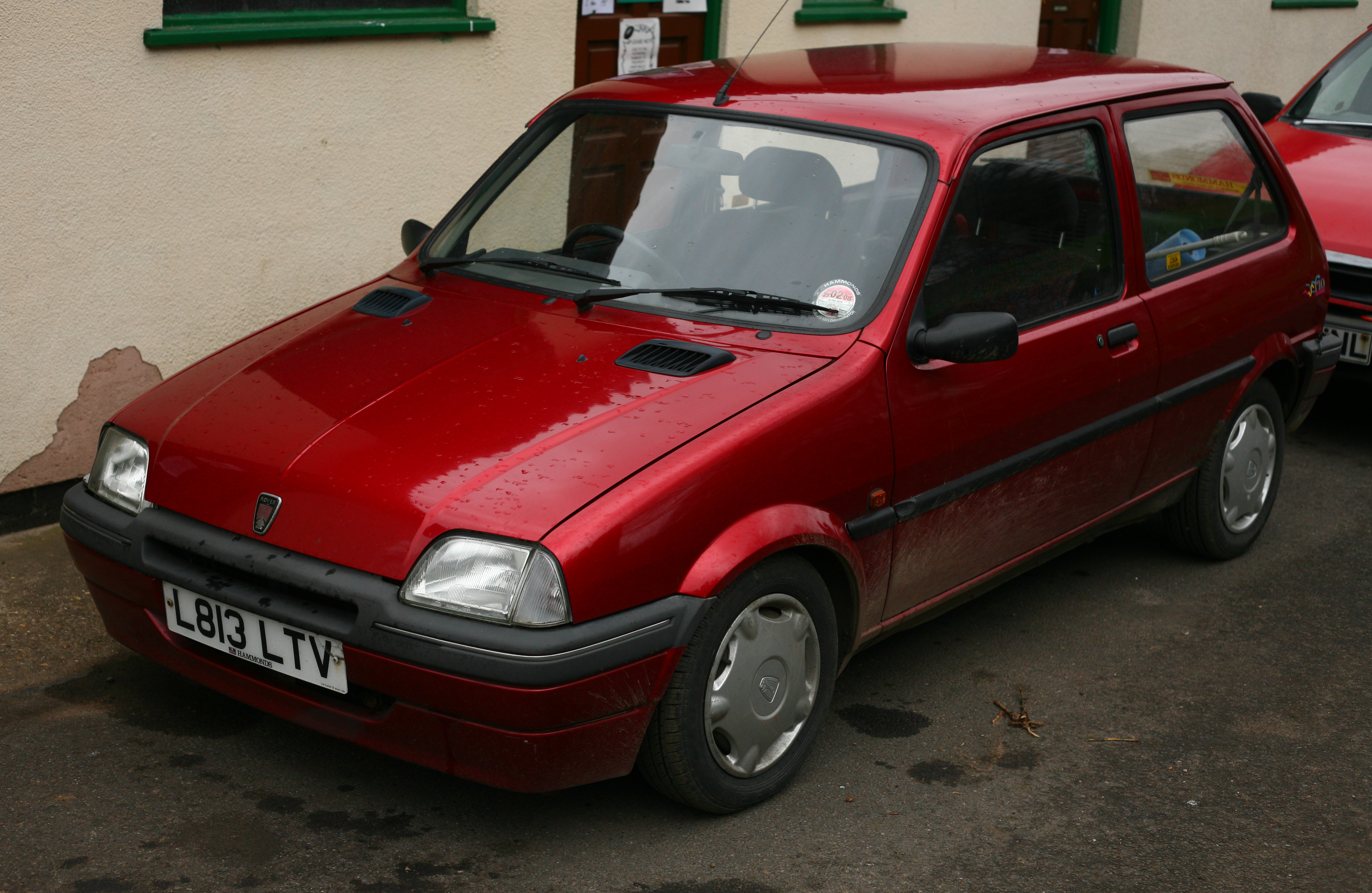
Rover Metro (1990–1994)

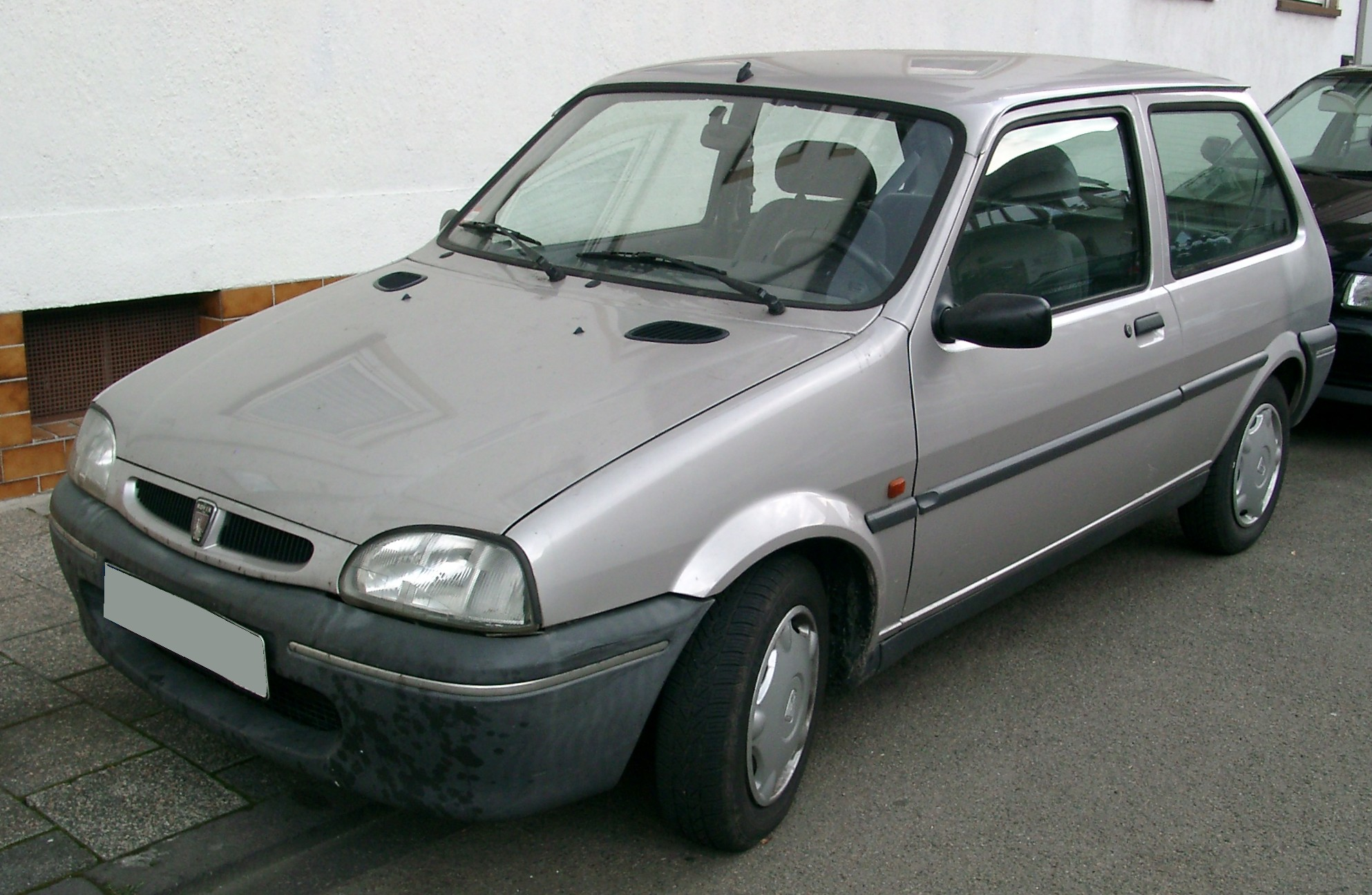
Rover 100 (1995–1997)

May 1990 saw Rover give the decade-old Metro a major reworking, which most notably included internal and external restyling, as well as new 1.1 and 1.4 K-Series petrol engines. The new Metro offered some of the best standards of specification in any supermini at the time, and it sold well until being replaced by the Rover 100 (essentially another update of the original 1980 design) in December 1994. The Rover 100 remained in production for three years, selling reasonably well, until it was discontinued after a dismal crash test performance that saw demand fall dramatically. Its demise marked the passing of the last design from the British Leyland era of the company with production ceasing at the end of 1997.

=== Rover 600 series ===
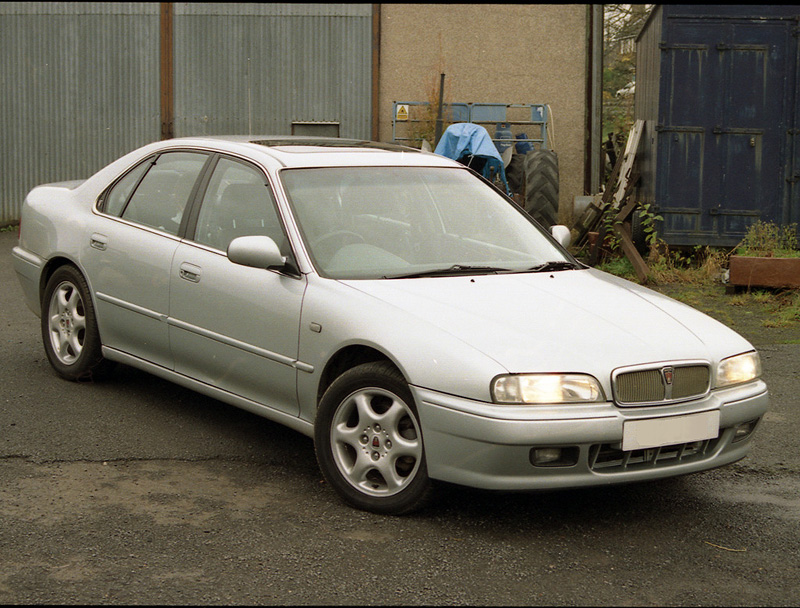
Rover 620 ti

Rover entered the compact executive market in April 1993 with its 600 range. Sold only as a four-door saloon, the 600 was based on the Honda Accord but used Rover engines as well as Honda engines (Honda used Rover's diesel engine in their European Accord) and had a classier interior. It was very popular in the compact executive market, but could not match the ever-popular BMW 3 Series. This was down in part to the pricing and model restrictions BMW (Rover group's owner) had placed on the 600 series and its very close ties with the more downmarket Honda Accord. Production ended in early 1999 to make way for the new 75 model.

=== Maestro/Montego ===
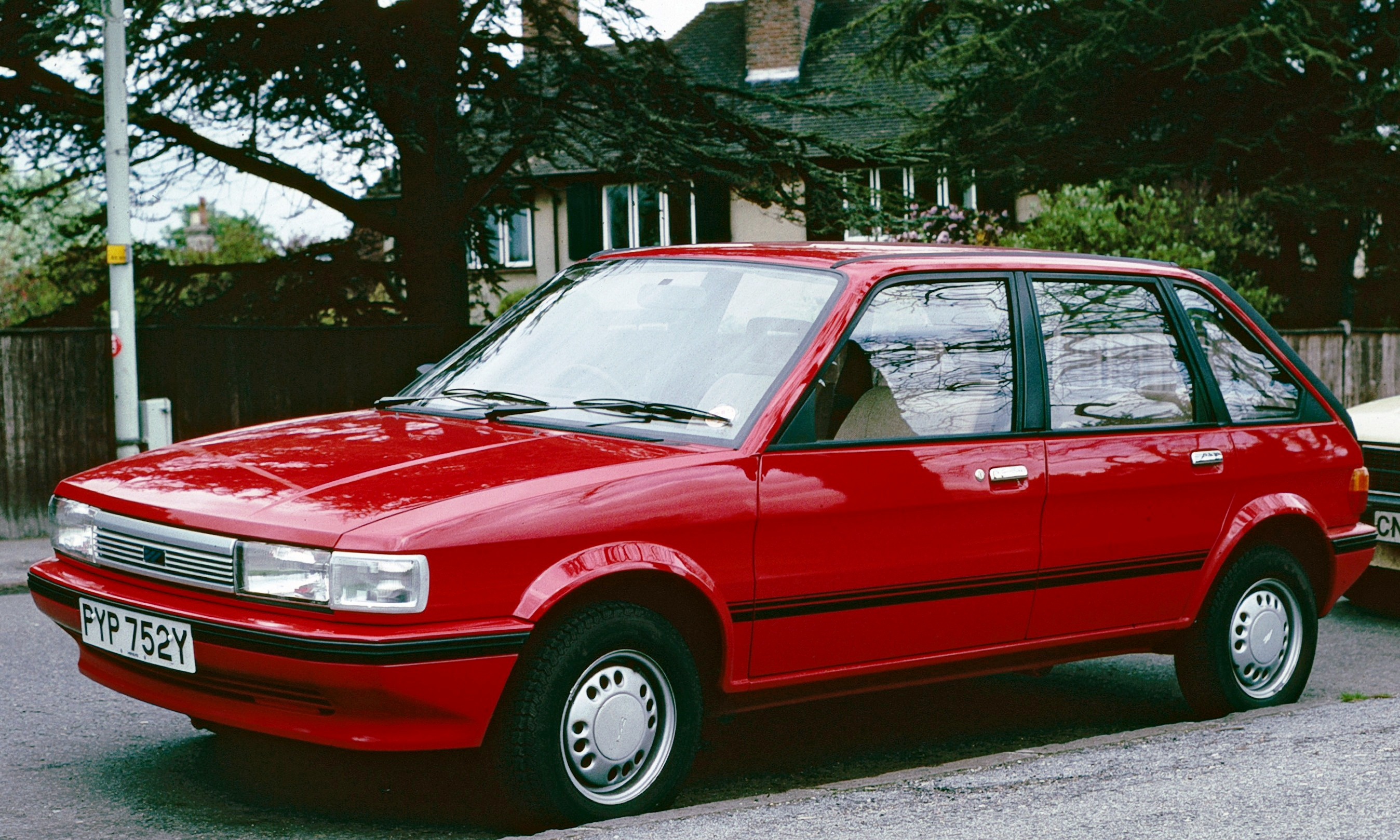
An early 1983 Maestro

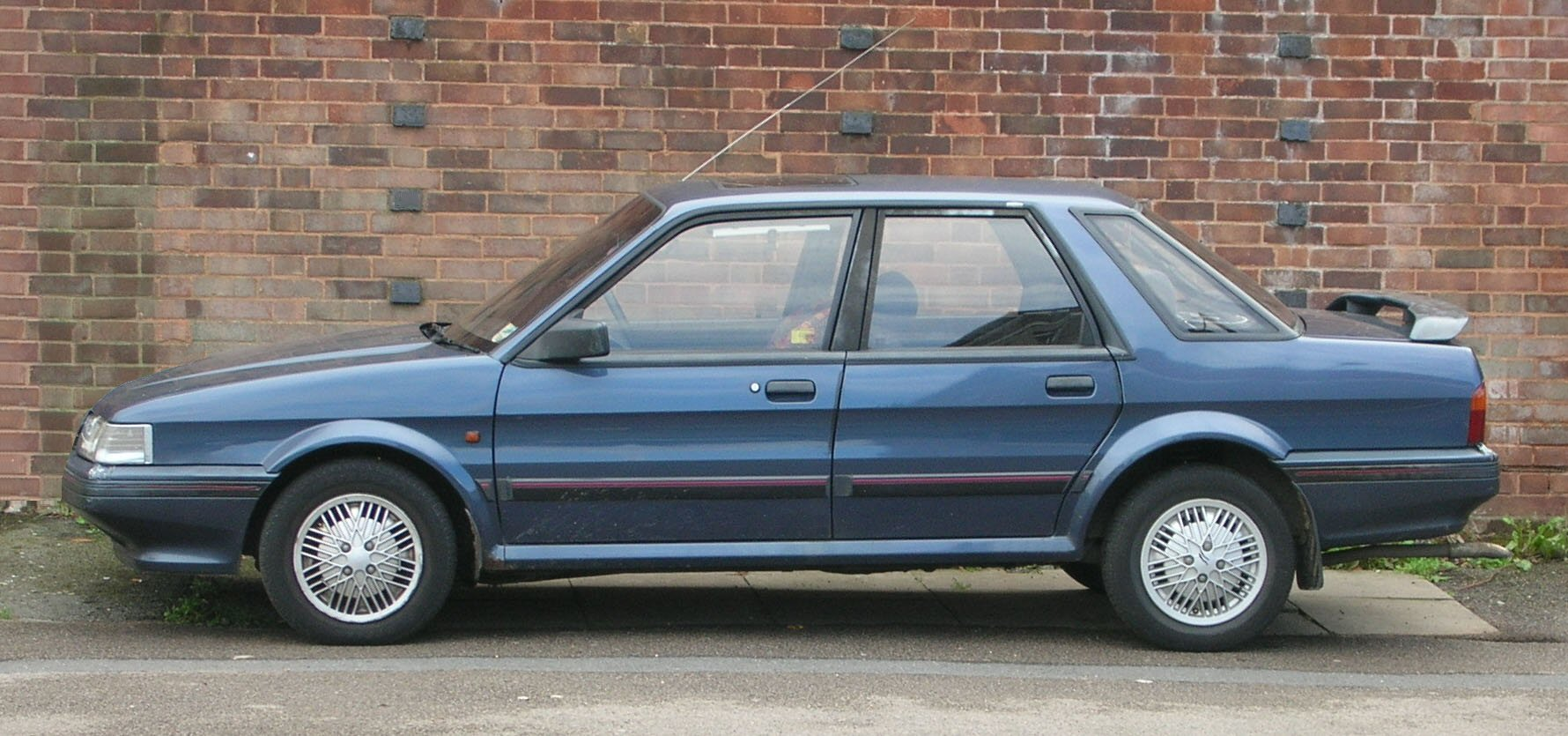
Post-facelift 1990 Montego

Unlike the Metro, which had received a major reengineering and was rebadged a Rover, the two last bastions from the British Leyland era had become increasingly uncompetitive in the marketplace and were kept in production merely to cater for the budget end of the market and for sale to fleets, as the newer Rover badged models were pushed further upmarket compared to rivals from Ford and General Motors (Vauxhall/Opel). The MG and high specification variants were both dropped from the Maestro/Montego ranges in 1991 so as not to overlap with the more expensive Rovers. Both had already lost their Austin badging in 1987 and were now known simply by their model names. Although the Montego had received a package of revisions for the 1989 model year, the Maestro remained essentially unchanged until 1992 when it received the Montego's revised dashboard. The Maestro/Montego production line was effectively closed in 1993 (leading to the eventual sale and demolition of the old Morris Motors' works at Cowley in which it was located), and the last cars were essentially hand built on a purpose-built line. By 1994 the Montego saloon was only available to special order, and the Maestro was produced in basic 'Clubman' trim with either 1.3 petrol or 2.0 diesel power.

Both models were discontinued in December 1994, being replaced by the new Honda Civic based Rover 400 series.

In September 1995, production of the Maestro was moved to Varna, Bulgaria, where it was sold in complete knock down (CKD) kit form by Rodacar AD. By April 1996, around 2,000 vehicles had been produced before the company ceased its operations due to high import costs of the components and low demand for the cars.

In May 1997, Parkway Services based in Ledbury purchased 621 of the kits that were not shipped to Bulgaria. These kits were built up and converted to right-hand drive. The conversions involved a brand new dash, right-hand drive wipers, and a steering column. These cars had a list price of £4995, which meant they were the cheapest new cars on sale in Britain between 1998 and 2001. Ledbury-built Maestros all had non-Rover VIN numbers.

A number of former Bulgarian cars were also sold in the UK by Apple 2000 Ltd, located in Culford, Bury St Edmunds. These vehicles, which were sold between 1998 and 2001, were similar to the Ledbury Maestro, but can be differentiated by their left-hand drive windscreen wipers and door mirrors. Because these were fully-built cars that were imported back to the UK, Apple 2000 Maestros have Rover VINs.

=== Land Rover ===
The Land Rover arm of the Rover Group expanded dramatically after the late 1980s. The Range Rover was officially introduced to the American market in 1987 after years of only being available as a grey-market vehicle. The first NAS Range Rover was sold on 16 March 1987, with demand far exceeding supply; Range Rovers were often resold for far more than their retail price. This was after its repositioning as a luxury vehicle, with higher equipment levels and options such as an automatic transmission and a diesel engine option being offered for the first time. The successful Discovery 'family' 4x4 was launched in Europe in 1989 and became Europe's top-selling 4x4 within 18 months. The Discovery brought with it an advanced diesel engine, which was soon fitted to the other models in the range.

This period saw Land Rover rationalise its operations, closing down satellite factories and increasing parts-sharing between models (axles, transmissions and engines were all shared, and the Discovery used the same chassis and many body panels as the Range Rover). The Ninety/One Ten range was fitted with the new diesel engine and renamed the Defender in 1990. An all-new Range Rover was launched in 1994, together with an improved Discovery which maintained high sales. A fourth model, the 'mini-SUV' Freelander was introduced in late 1997 and replaced the Discovery as Europe's best-selling 4x4 vehicle.

=== MG ===
The MG badge-engineering project (first implemented by Austin Rover in 1982 with the Metro) ended in 1991 despite some reasonable success for its Austin Maestro and Austin Montego ranges (the MG Metro had been discontinued after the facelift in 1990). The MG badge was revived in 1992 on the MG RV8 – an updated MG MGB which made use of a 3.9 V8 Range Rover power unit, but lacked modern refinements that were expected in similarly priced sports car of its era. The car didn't sell as strongly as earlier MG sports car, and production had ended by 1995.

The "real" rebirth of MG sports cars occurred in 1995, when the MG F was launched. Powered by a 1.8 16-valve mid-mounted engine, it was an instant hit with buyers thanks to its distinctive styling and excellent ride and handling. It was a huge success in the roadster renaissance of the late 1990s, despite some buyers being let down by lacklusture build quality and reliability.

The MG name was revived on passenger cars in 2001 when the ZR, ZS and ZT models launched, based on the Rover 25, 45 and 75 models respectively.

== Sponsorship ==
Rover Group sponsored the Scottish football team Dundee United from 1994 to 1996. The first match of the sponsorship was Dundee United's Scottish Cup triumph in 1994, the club's first ever success in the competition. The company also sponsored Premier League club Aston Villa between 2002 and 2004.
