= Leyland DAF =

Former British commercial vehicle manufacturing company

- Industry: Commercial vehicles
- Predecessor: Rover Group (Leyland truck division); Rover Group (Freight Rover division)
- Founded: February 1987; 39 years ago
- Founder: DAF Beheer; Rover Group
- Defunct: February 1993; 33 years ago
- Fate: Administration
- Successor: Leyland Trucks; Albion Automotive; LDV; Multipart Solutions
- Headquarters: Leyland, United Kingdom
- Number of locations: Leyland (trucks); Glasgow (truck axles); Birmingham (vans)
- Products: Trucks and vans
- Owner: DAF NV

Leyland DAF was a commercial vehicle manufacturing company based in Leyland, United Kingdom, and a subsidiary of DAF NV. In February 1993, Leyland DAF was placed into receivership.

== History ==
Leyland DAF was formed in February 1987, when the Leyland Trucks division, including the Freight Rover van making interests, of the British Rover Group merged with the Dutch DAF Trucks company to form DAF NV which was owned by DAF Beheer (60%) and Rover Group (40%).

In June 1989, it was floated on the Dutch and London Stock Exchanges. The new company traded as Leyland DAF in the United Kingdom, and as DAF elsewhere. The company manufactured trucks at its plants in Eindhoven, Netherlands and Leyland, United Kingdom, and vans at its Washwood Heath (Birmingham) plant in the United Kingdom.

Following the insolvency of DAF NV in February 1993, Leyland DAF went into receivership. Four new companies emerged from it as management buyouts:

- LDV Group as a van manufacturer based in Birmingham; continued trading until 2009.
- Multipart Solutions, which was formed out of the firms parts company based in Chorley; later acquired by TVS Supply Chain Solutions.
- Leyland Trucks as a truck manufacturer based in Leyland; would be acquired by Paccar in 1998.
- Albion Automotive as a truck components manufacturer based in Glasgow and Leyland; later acquired by American Axle.

Leyland Trucks and DAF Trucks (the Dutch successor to DAF NV) would both later come back together in 1998 when Paccar acquired Leyland Trucks.

Despite the company ceasing trading in 1993, the Leyland DAF marque remained on some existing trucks until 2000, after which the Leyland part of the marque was dropped and trucks coming out of the Leyland plant started being solely produced under the DAF marque.

In July 1994, Leyland Technical Centre, formerly part of the Leyland DAF global test operations, and located close to the Leyland Trucks site also emerged as a management buyout. In February 2005, the company was renamed MI Technology Group and in 2013, the CSA Group. In June 2017, it was purchased by Spectris, owners of the Millbrook Proving Ground.

== Vehicles ==
Vans
Model Name	Years Produced	Image
Leyland DAF 200 Series	1989-1993	Leyland DAF 200
Leyland DAF 400 Series	1989-1993	1992 Leyland DAF 400 2.0

Trucks
Model Name	Years Produced	Load Capacity	Image
Leyland DAF 45	1987-1993	5000kg	Leyland DAF 45
Leyland Daf 50	1987-1993	4 tonnes	Leyland DAF Sweeper, Oulton Broad - Flickr - sludgegulper
Leyland DAF 60	1987-1993	Up to 18000kg	
Leyland DAF 70	1987-1993	18000-26000kg	Leyland DAF 70
Leyland DAF 80	1987-1993	18000-38000kg	Leyland DAF DROPS Heavy Utility Truck (Demountable Rack Offload and Pickup System) pic5
