= DAF NV =

Dutch holding company

- Type: Holding company
- Industry: Automotive
- Predecessor: DAF Trucks; Leyland Trucks Division; Freight Rover
- Founded: 6 April 1987; 39 years ago
- Founder: DAF Beheer; Rover Group
- Defunct: February 1993; 33 years ago
- Successor: DAF Trucks; Leyland Trucks; LDV
- Headquarters: Eindhoven, Netherlands
- Products: Trucks; Vans
- Parent: DAF Beheer (60%); Rover Group (40%)
- Subsidiaries: DAF Trucks; Leyland DAF

DAF NV (originally DAF BV) was a holding company formed in April 1987, when DAF Trucks and the Leyland Trucks division of the Rover Group merged. In February 1993, it was placed in receivership.

== History ==
DAF BV was formed on 6 April 1987, when the Dutch DAF Trucks company merged with the Leyland Trucks division of the British Rover Group, which included the van making business of Freight Rover. The new company was jointly owned by DAF Beheer (60%) and Rover Group (40%).

In June 1989, DAF was floated on the Amsterdam and London Stock Exchanges, and renamed DAF NV with DAF Beheer and the Rover Group (now owned by British Aerospace) reducing their shareholdings to 22% and 16% respectively. DAF NV's products were sold under the Leyland DAF banner in the United Kingdom, and as DAF elsewhere.

It manufactured trucks at its plants in Eindhoven and Leyland, and vans at its plant in Washwood Heath (Birmingham). In February 1993, DAF NV was placed in receivership, after a downturn in sales and an inability to refinance, with the business sold in three management buyouts:

- DAF Trucks, as a truck manufacturer based in Eindhoven, with the Flemish and Netherlands governments holding the majority of the shares.
- Leyland Trucks, as a truck manufacturer based in Leyland, England
- LDV, as a van manufacturer based in Birmingham, England backed by 3i, which continued trading until 2009.

DAF Trucks and Leyland Trucks ended up both being acquired by Paccar, DAF Trucks in 1996 and Leyland Trucks in 1998 respectively. while LDV shut down and its intellectual property was acquired by SAIC Motor.
