= Tata Estate =

Station wagon

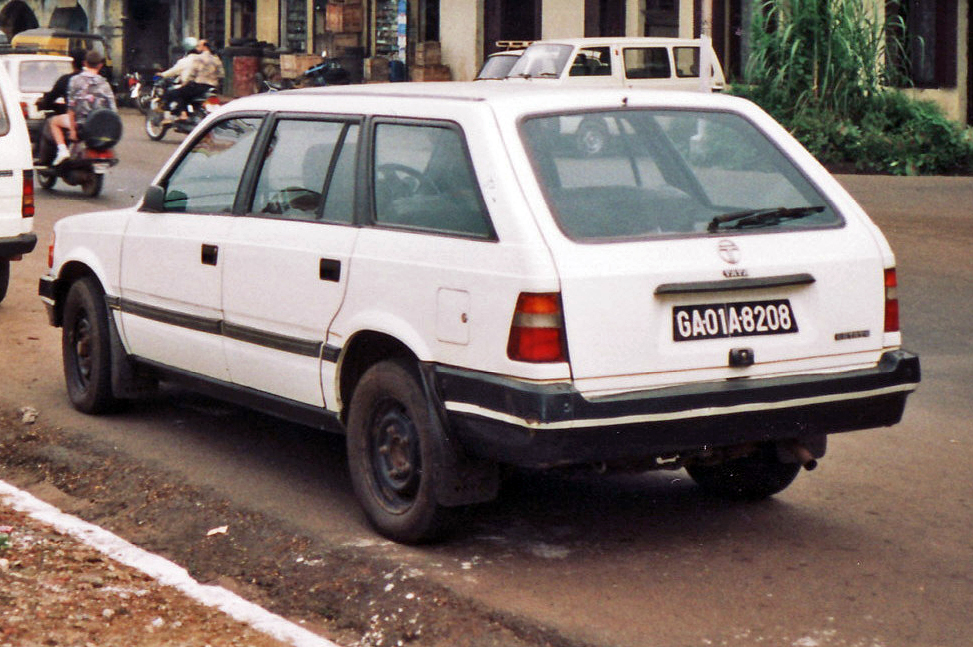

Overview
- Manufacturer: Tata Motors
- Production: 1992–2000
- Assembly: India: Pune

Body and chassis
- Class: Full-size car
- Body style: 5-door station wagon
- Layout: Front-engine, rear-wheel-drive
- Platform: Tata X2
- Related: Tata Sierra; Tata Telcoline; Tata Sumo; Tata Safari

Powertrain
- Engine: 1.9 L Peugeot XD88 diesel I4
- Transmission: 5-speed manual

Dimensions
- Wheelbase: 2,825 mm (111.2 in)
- Length: 4,610 mm (181.5 in)
- Width: 1,700 mm (66.9 in)
- Height: 1,610 mm (63.4 in)
- Kerb weight: 1,640 kg (3,616 lb)

The Tata Estate is a station wagon car that was produced by Indian car manufacturer Tata Motors (then known as Tata Engineering) between 1992 and 2000.

Tata was already a major player in the heavy vehicle segment and the Estate was the company's first attempt at building a passenger car. The car was considered fairly advanced during its production time and had many features which were not common among other Indian cars available at the same price range then. The car came with power windows, power steering and a tachometer.

The Estate's exterior was inspired by the Mercedes-Benz station wagons design made at the time of conception, in particular the T-series estate-type cars.

== History ==
The Tata Estate was introduced in 1992 and production ran until 2000.

The Estate was powered by a Peugeot sourced 1.9-litre diesel engine producing 68 PS (50 kW; 67 bhp) at 4500 rpm and torque of 118 N⋅m (87 lb⋅ft) at 2500 rpm, mated to a 5-speed manual transmission.

The Estate followed after the production of the Tata Sierra in 1991. It was initially plagued with problems due to high fuel consumption, faulty electrical systems and suspensions before they were fixed in subsequent productions.

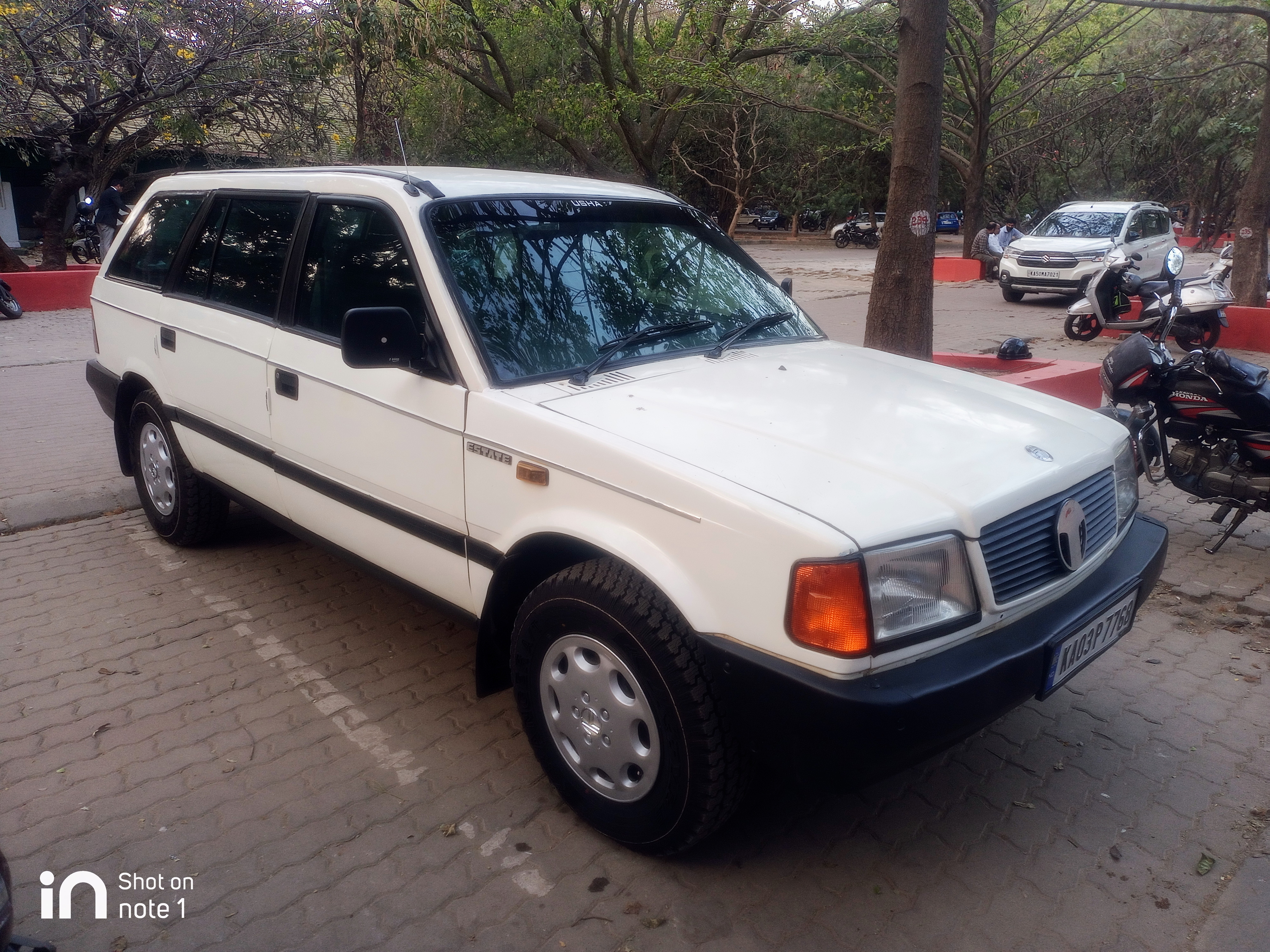
Front right quarter view

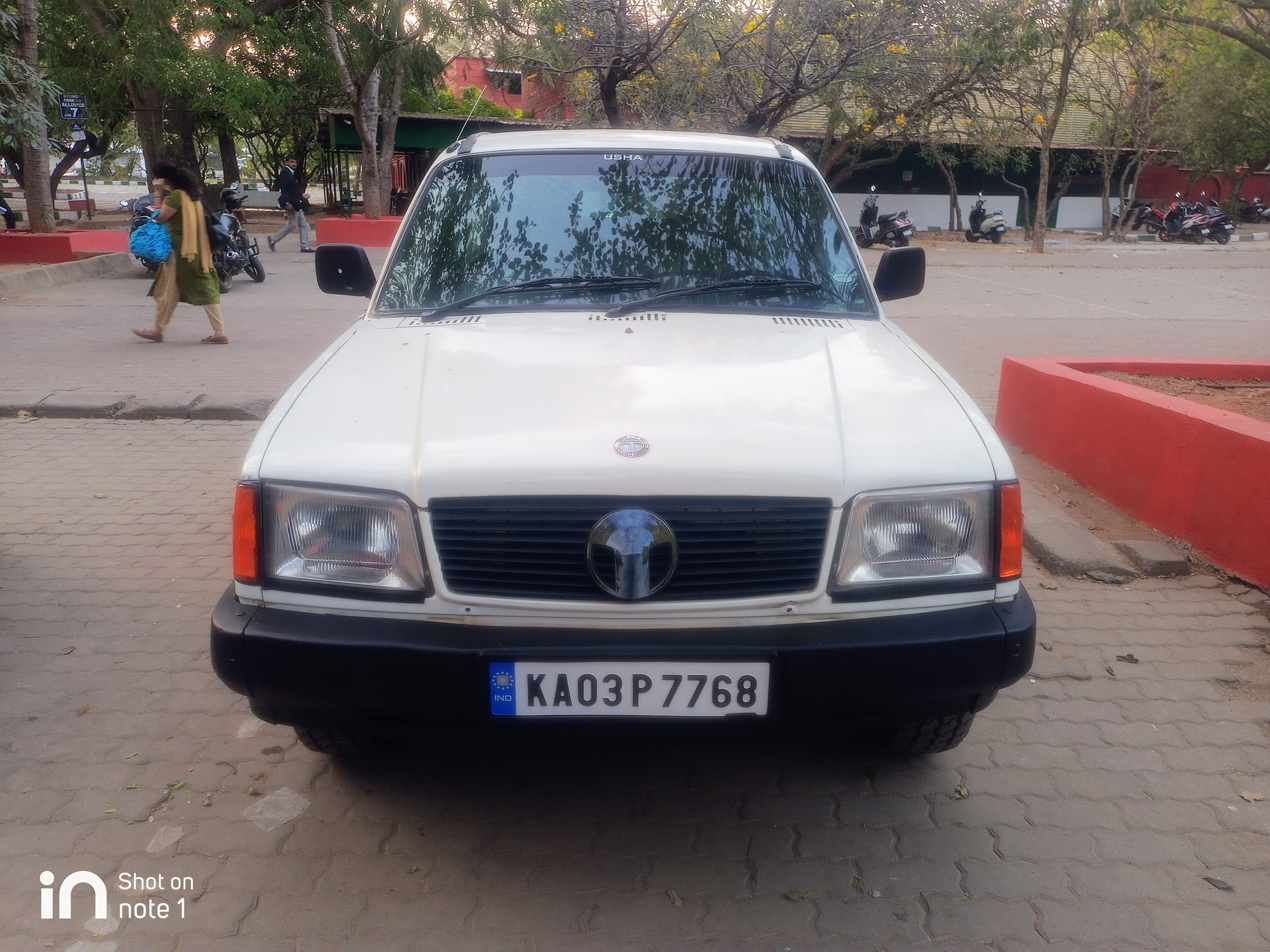
Tata Estate front fascia.

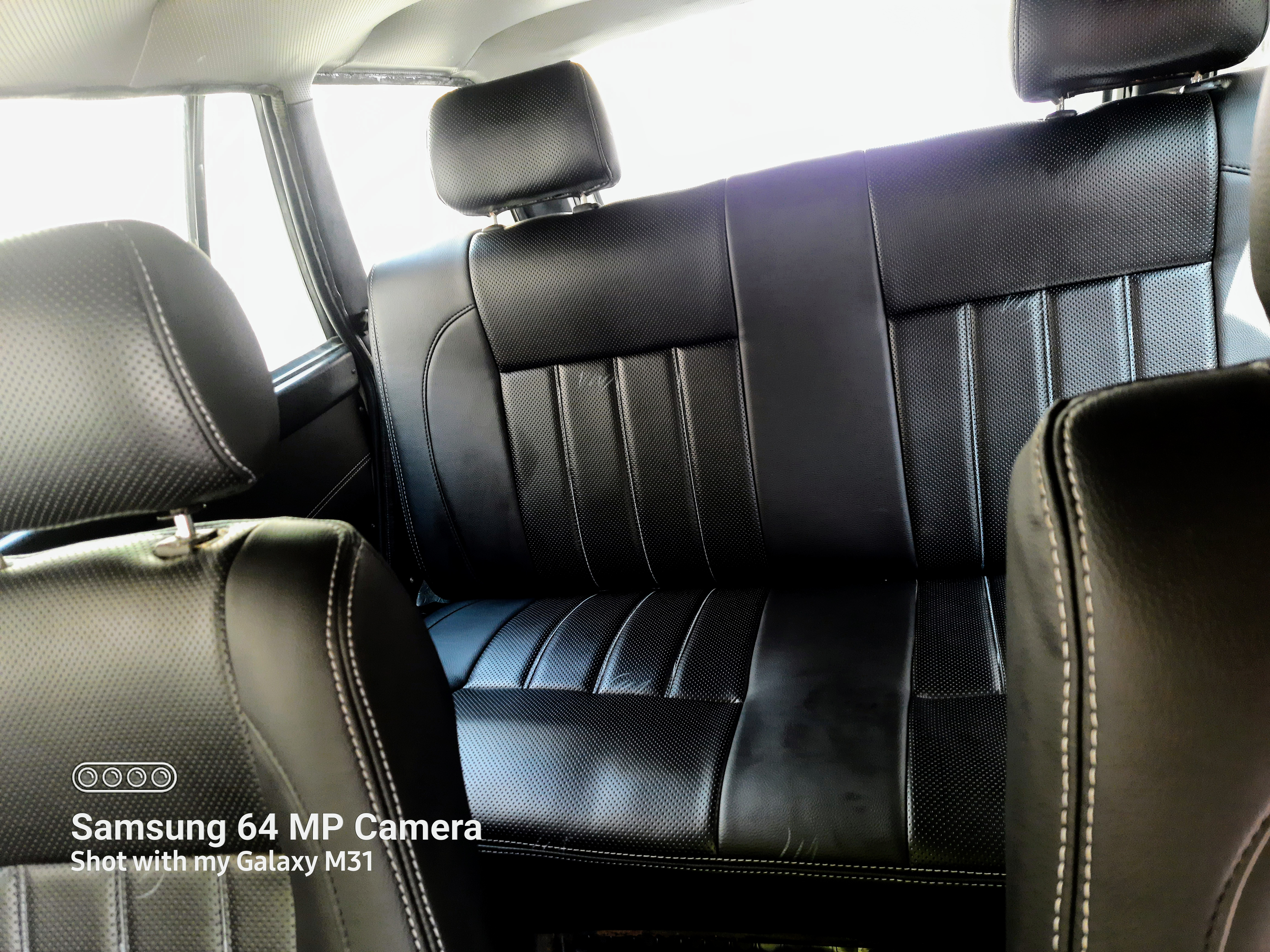
Rear seating of the car

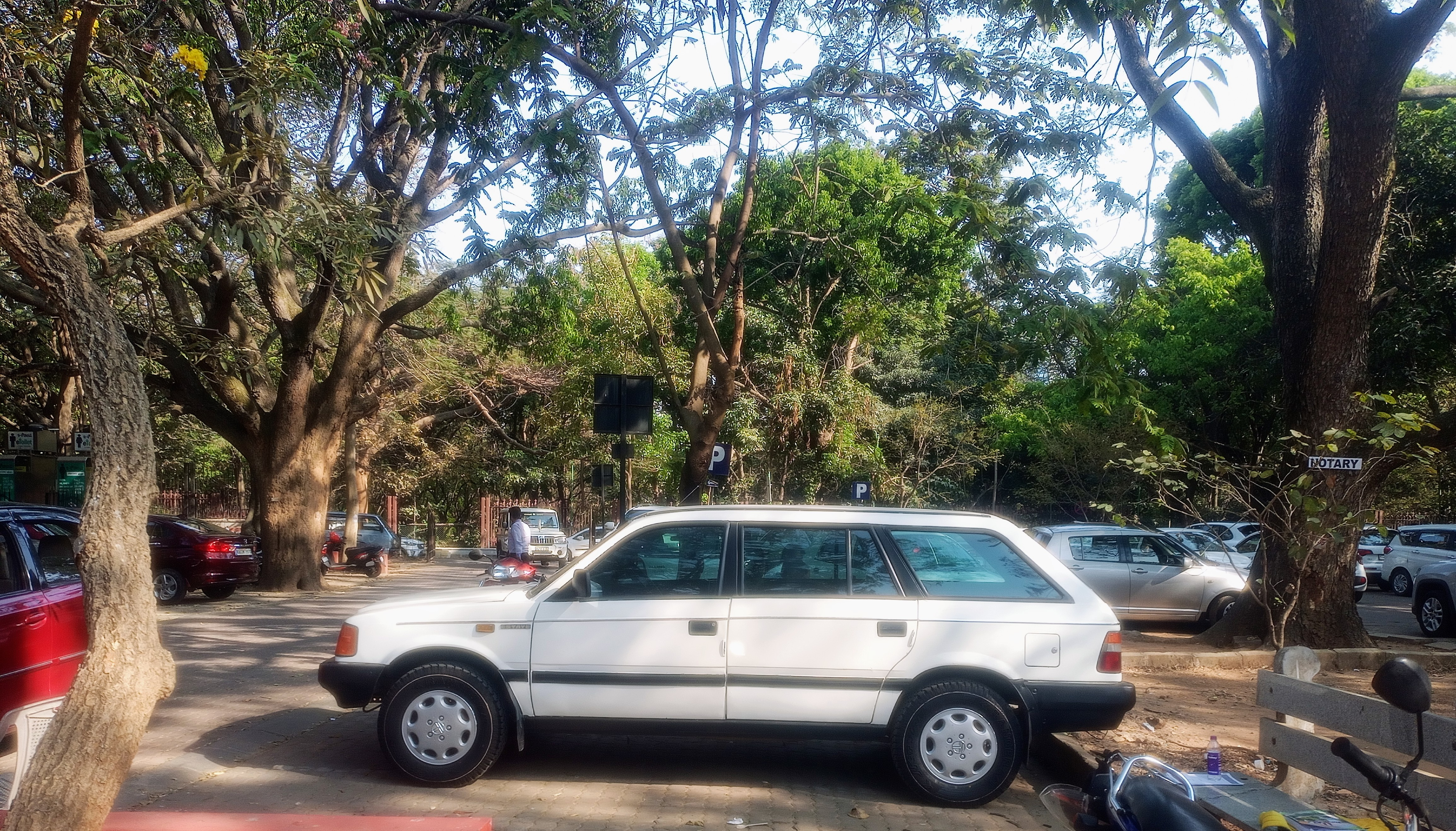
Side view

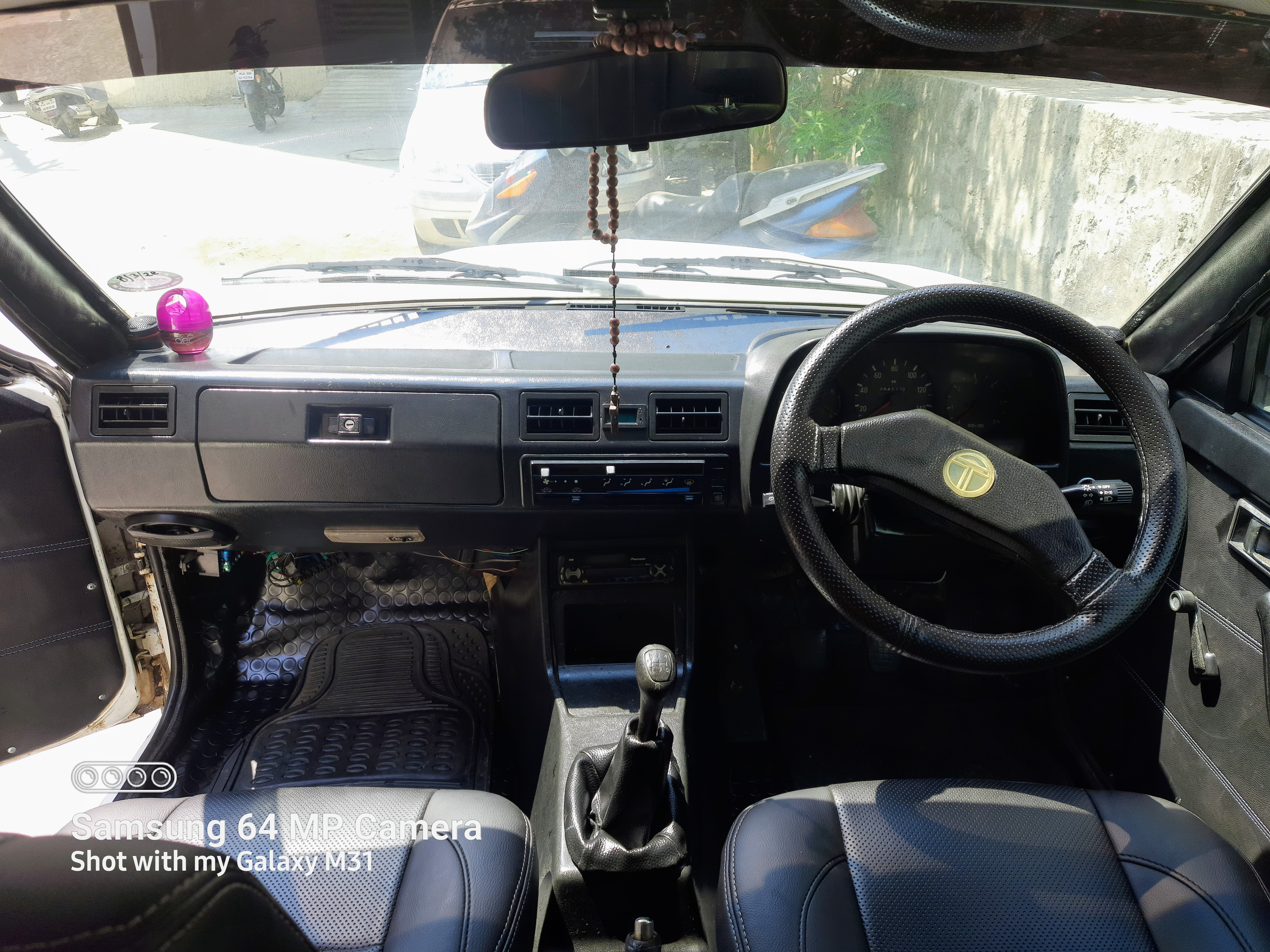
Interior Dashboard layout

== Specifications ==
The platform of the Estate was based on the Tata Telcoline pick-up truck, which saved the company around Rs. 10 crore (at that time) in development costs.
