= Tata Sumo Grande =

Mid-size SUV

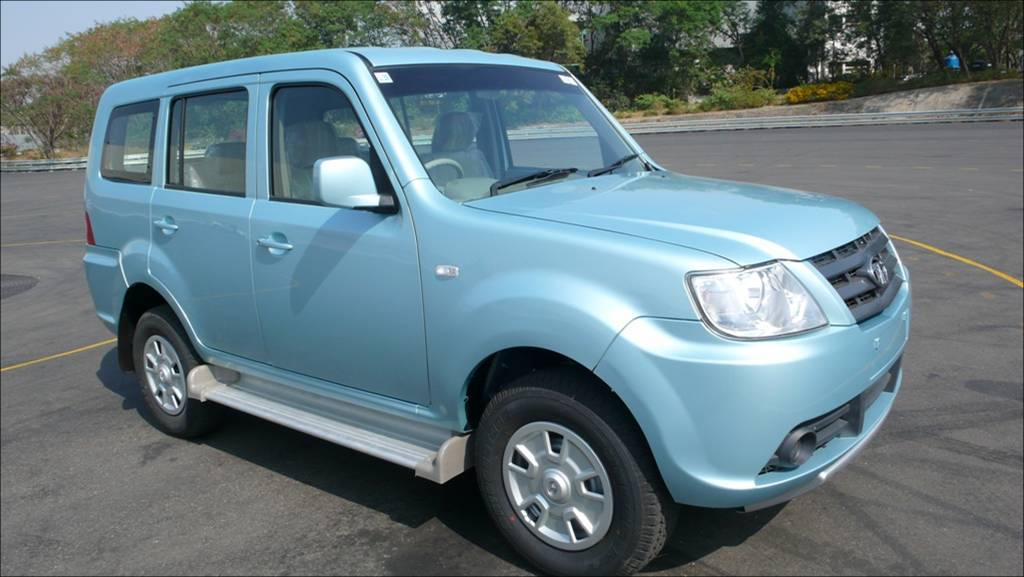

Overview
- Manufacturer: Tata Motors
- Also called: Tata Grande; Tata Movus
- Production: 2008–2016
- Assembly: India: Pune

Body and chassis
- Class: Mid-size SUV
- Body style: 5-door SUV
- Layout: Front-engine, rear-wheel-drive
- Platform: Tata X2
- Related: Tata Safari; Tata Aria; Tata Telcoline

Powertrain
- Engine: 2.2L Dicor diesel I4; 2.2L Varicor diesel I4
- Transmission: 5-speed manual

Dimensions
- Wheelbase: 2,550 mm (100.4 in)
- Length: 4,421 mm (174.1 in)
- Width: 1,780–1,853 mm (70.1–73.0 in)
- Height: 1,940 mm (76.4 in)

Chronology
- Predecessor: Tata Sumo

The Tata Sumo Grande is a mid-size SUV produced by the Indian automobile manufacturer Tata Motors from 2008 to 2016. In 2014 the name was changed to Tata Movus.

== Sumo Grande (2008–2010) ==
The Sumo Grande (codeproject Phoenix during development phase) is a mid-size SUV developed by Tata Motors on the revised body-on-frame X2 platform with part of the rear end derived from the previous Sumo of 1994. Like the Xenon, the Sumo Grande was designed by Concept Group International LTD in the UK. The car was originally intended to be the second generation of the Sumo, placing lower in the Tata range than the Safari, however the old Sumo remained in production due to sales success in India because of a reduced list price reduced and consequently the Sumo Grande will support the previous model without ever replacing it. Part of the development was entrusted to IAV India Private Ltd.

The body measures 4,421mm long, a little less than the previous Sumo. The cockpit is available in seven and eight-seater configurations, and later nine seat version was introduced. The X2 chassis uses the same double wishbone front suspension of the Xenon. The debut engine is the 2.2-liter diesel common rail Dicor VGT delivering 120 horsepower, 20 horsepower less than the Safari with the same engine. The car is offered with rear-wheel drive only, without safety equipment (ABS, ESP and airbags) to avoid internal competition with the Tata Safari. Aesthetically, the car has a five-door body, stylistically inspired by the previous Sumo but more modern. The interior is the same as that of the original Sumo. The third row of seats has a two or three seat bench, while in the old Sumo the seats were single folding seats.

== Sumo Grande MK II (2010–2014) ==
The Sumo Grande MKII is a facelift of the previous version with many revised details, especially in the mechanics with modified rear suspension for greater comfort. The steering was revised due to the previous version having been criticized for not being very direct. It received a new front grille and restyled indicators. On the interior it got new faux wood paneling and new fabrics for the door panels. The 9-seater version also makes its debut with two folding rear seats.

In 2011, Tata dropped the "Sumo" nameplate and the vehicle was simply called "Tata Grande".

== Tata Movus (2014–2016) ==
In 2014, with the facelift, the name Sumo Grande was abandoned in favor of Movus to avoid confusion with the first generation of Tata Sumo, which was still in production. However, the characteristics of the vehicle remained unaltered. The changes were limited to the interior trim and the color range for the body, which was reduced to white and silver, while the equipment was simplified. The bumpers were no longer painted but made of raw plastic; consequently, the list price was lowered considerably. The engine remained the 2.2-liter Dicor common rail diesel with 120 horsepower. However, sales were disappointing and in 2015, the end of production scheduled for 2016 was announced. A direct successor was not proposed, however the first generation of Sumo (originally launched in 1994) collected part of the inheritance being constantly updated.

== Sumo Grande Specifications ==
Specification	Value
Top speed	140 km/h (87 mph)
0 to 100 km/h (62 mph)	17.6 s
Engine Type	2.2L DiCOR, 32 Bit ECU and Variable Geometry Turbocharger
Displacement	2179 cc
Power	120 PS (88 kW; 120 hp) @ 4000 rpm
Torque	250 N⋅m (180 lb⋅ft) @1500 rpm
Valve Mechanism	DOHC
Cylinder Configuration	Inline 4
Fuel Type	Diesel
Fuel System	
Minimum Turning Radius	5.3 metres
Wheelsize	16 inch
Tyres	235/70 R 16 (tubeless)
Ground Clearance	205 mm / 8.07 inches
