= Tata Telcoline =

Mid-size pickup truck

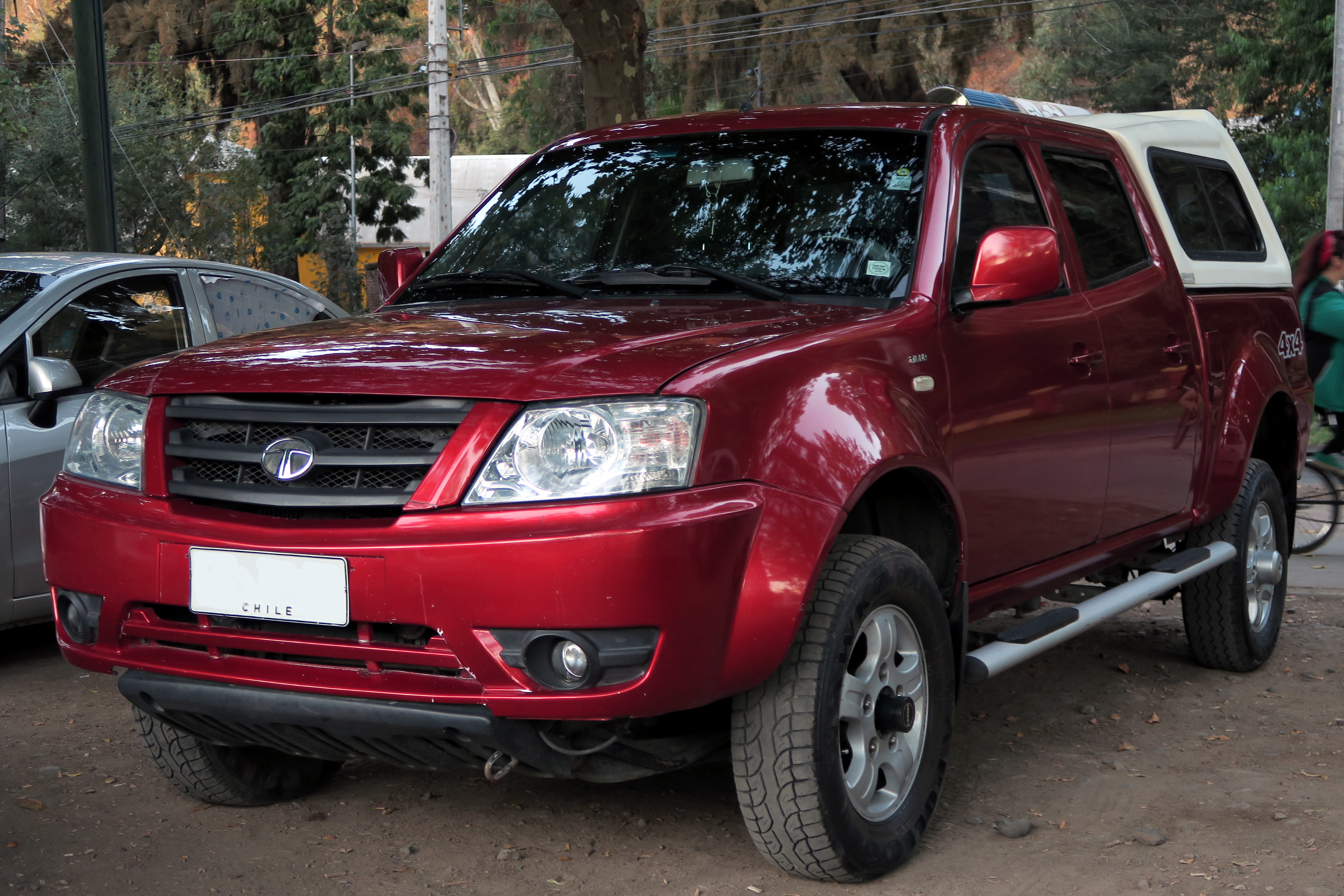
- Tata Xenon DLE 2013

Overview
- Manufacturer: Tata Motors
- Production: 1988–present

Body and chassis
- Body style: 2-door pick-up 4-door pick-up

The Tata Telcoline is a mid-size pickup truck made by the Indian automaker Tata Motors since 1988. In India, it was originally known as the Tatamobile 206, and since 2002, the name was changed to the Tata 207 DI. In export markets, it has been sold as the Tatamobile, Tata Loadbeta, Tata Xenon and Tata Pick Up.

== First generation (1988–2008) ==
Tata Telcoline
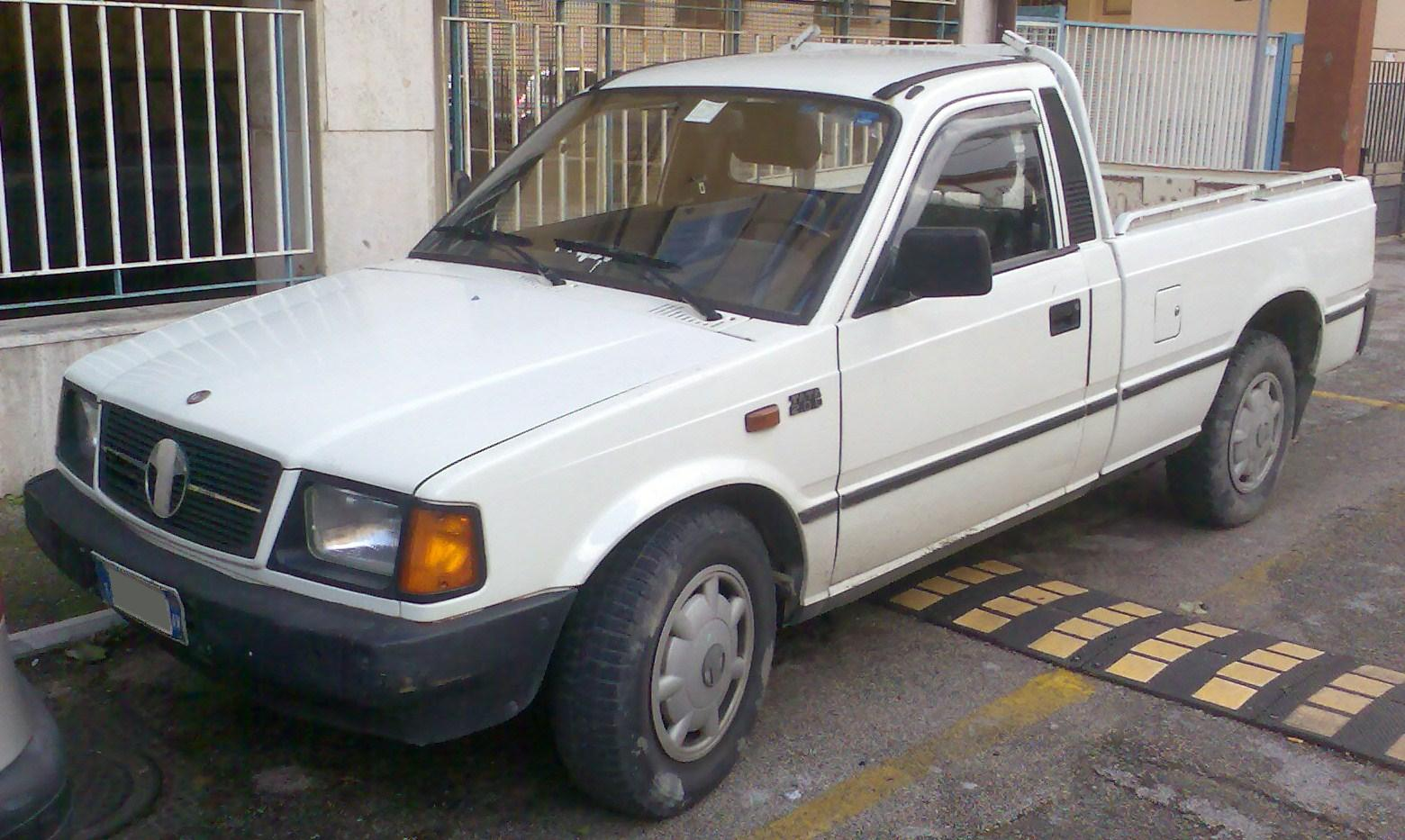
- 1990 Tata Telcoline 2.0 TDI

Overview
- Also called: Tatamobile 206; Tata Pick-Up; Tata 207; Tata TL; Tata Loadbeta
- Production: 1988–2006; 1988–2008 (Europe)
- Assembly: Pune, India; Pekan, Pahang, Malaysia

Body and chassis
- Layout: Front-engine, rear-wheel-drive Front-engine four-wheel-drive
- Platform: Tata X2
- Related: Tata Sierra; Tata Estate; Tata Sumo; Tata Safari

Powertrain
- Engine: diesel: 1948 cc Peugeot XD88 I4; 1948 cc 483DL I4; 1948 cc 483DL turbo I4; 2179 cc Dicor I4; 2956 cc Dicor 497SP I4
- Transmission: 5-speed manual

Dimensions
- Wheelbase: 2,825–3,150 mm (111.2–124.0 in)
- Length: 4,585–5,210 mm (180.5–205.1 in)
- Width: 1,700–1,810 mm (66.9–71.3 in)
- Height: 1,600–1,730 mm (63.0–68.1 in)
- Curb weight: 1,715–1,995 kg (3,781–4,398 lb)

Introduced in July 1988, the Tatamobile 206 pick-up (the original name used in India) was designed and engineered by Telco (Tata Engineering and Locomotive Company) and was the first light commercial vehicle launched by Tata Motors after the heavy duty Tata 407 (a vehicle based on the Mercedes-Benz T2 design). Developed in two years, the pick up sold a total of 61,691 examples in India during the 1988 and 1989 model years and 64,941 vehicles between 1989 and 1990. With the Tatamobile 206, the Indian automaker acquired 25% of the market share in the light commercial vehicle segment.

The Tatamobile 206 is a mid-size pick-up produced on a flexible body-on-frame chassis (called Tata X2 platform) in both short wheelbase (single cab, 2 seats) and long wheelbase (crew cab, 5 seats) with rear or four wheel drive: the 4WD version has a higher ground clearance for improved off-road use. On the same X2 platform, Tata Motors produced the compact 3-door Tata Sierra SUV (launched in 1991), the 5-door Tata Estate wagon and the 5-door Safari SUV, Sumo and Spacio. Originally in India, it was powered by a naturally aspirated 2.0-litre (1,948 cc) diesel Peugeot XD88 engine (assembled under licence by Tata in India) that produced 63 hp (47 kW). In 1994, a Tata-built, stroked version of the unrelated Peugeot XUD9 engine with the same displacement as the old XD88 was added. A turbocharged version that produced 92 hp (69 kW) was also available.

In 1990, Tata started exporting the Tatamobile to South Africa with the name Telcoline and in 1994, Tata introduced a facelift for the Indian market with revised headlights. Tata also began exporting the vehicle to Europe. In Italy, it was sold as the Tata Pick-Up in single and crew-cab form with two trim levels: base level and Orciari, a more equipped version built by Italian firm Orciari with two-tone paint, front bull-bar, alloy wheels, air conditioning and a more refined interior. The engines available in Europe were the 2.0-litre Peugeot naturally aspirated diesel (63 HP) and turbo diesel (92 HP). With the introduction of the Euro 3 emission standards, the naturally aspirated version was phased out and the power of the turbocharged version was reduced to 88 horsepower.

In 2000, Tata Motors signed an agreement with Malaysia Truck & Bus (MTB) to assemble the Telcoline in complete knock down kit form at the Pekan, Pahang plant in Malaysia for sale on the local market. The pick-up was initially sold only in the 4WD double-cab version, though later on, the single-cab version was also introduced.

=== 2002 facelift ===
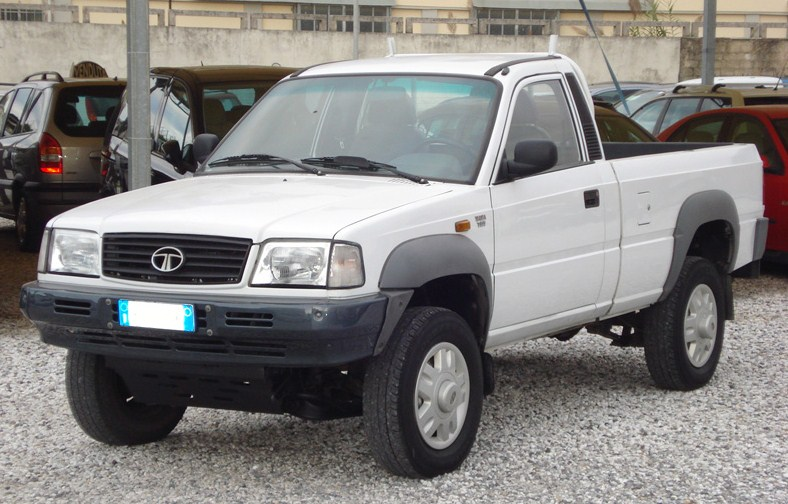
Facelift Tata Telcoline single-cab 4WD

In August 2002, a more substantial facelift was introduced: new front and rear bumpers, bonnet and front grille that houses the new Tata logo. Moreover, changes are made to the mechanicals and the new 3.0-litre diesel engine is introduced (the same used in the Tata 407). With the new engine, Tata changed the Indian market name from Tatamobile to Tata 207 DI. The 3.0-litre (2956 cc) naturally aspirated diesel produced 58 HP but had more torque than the outgoing 2.0-litre Peugeot unit, while the turbocharged version produced 87 HP and was homologated to meet Euro 4 regulations.

In September 2003, a joint venture was signed between Tata Motors and Phoenix Venture Holdings (MG Rover group) for the distribution and sale of the Tata 207 DI in the United Kingdom. In 2006 Tata introduced to the Indian market the 207 DI EX, a single cab version with flat load body and long wheelbase. In Europe the new 2.2 litre Dicor turbodiesel common rail engine Euro 4 that produce 140 horsepower was introduced. The 2.2-litre was based on the design of the 2,179 cc PSA DW12 engine and was re-engineered by Tata and AVL.

In 2005, for the first time, Tata introduced the four-wheel drive version of the Telcoline in India. It had previously only been produced for export markets. In India, the 4WD version was sold as the Tata TL, the rear-wheel drive version continued as the Tata 207. In 2008, export to Europe had ended, with Tata announcing its successor, the Xenon pick-up.

Today, production continues in India with exports to South Africa.

== Second generation (2006–present) ==
Second generation
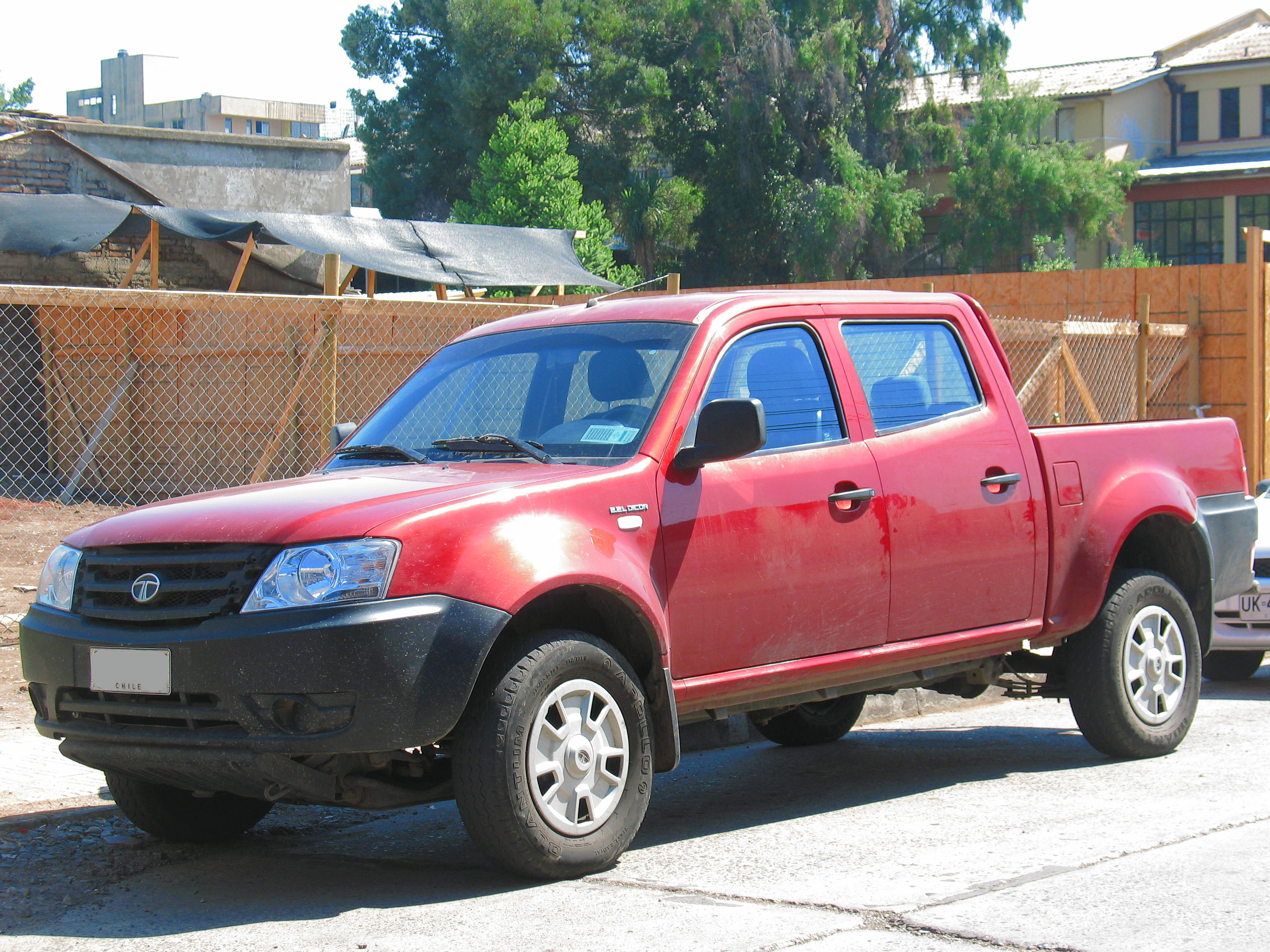

Overview
- Also called: Tata Xenon; Tata TL Sprint; Tata Yodha
- Production: 2006–present
- Assembly: Pune, India; Thonburi, Samutprakarn, Thailand (TAAP); Bangchan (Kannayao), Bangkok, Thailand (BGAC); Pekan, Pahang, Malaysia (DRB-HICOM)

Body and chassis
- Layout: Front-engine, rear-wheel-drive four-wheel-drive
- Platform: Tata X2
- Related: Tata Sumo Grande

Powertrain
- Engine: 2.1L MPFi 486PL 16V petrol I4; 2.1L MPFi 486PL 16V CNG I4; 2.2L VTT Dicor diesel I4; 3.0L Dicor turbodiesel I4
- Transmission: 5-speed manual 6-speed automatic

Dimensions
- Wheelbase: 2,850–3,150 mm (112.2–124.0 in)
- Length: 4,800–5,125 mm (189.0–201.8 in)
- Width: 1,860 mm (73.2 in)
- Height: 1,730–1,833 mm (68.1–72.2 in)
- Curb weight: 1,750–1,950 kg (3,858–4,299 lb)

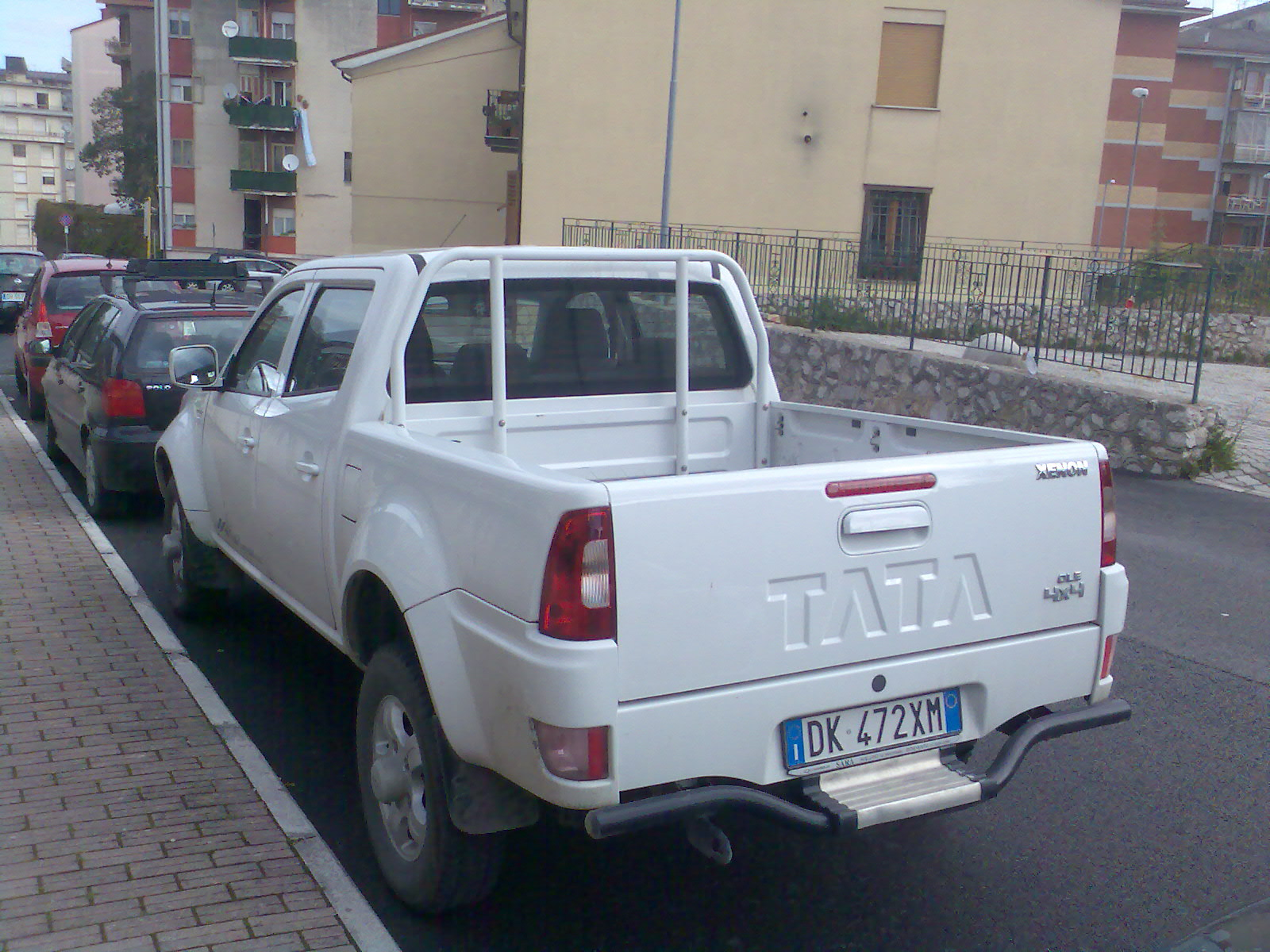
Tata Xenon double cab, rear view

Developed over 18 months, the new generation of the Tata pickup utilizes an evolved version of the previous body-on-frame X2 platform. The suspension geometry has been significantly revised, and the body incorporates a higher percentage of high-strength steel. Building on the success of the previous Telcoline, the new generation Tata is designed primarily for export to various countries, including those in Southeast Asia, EMEA, and Mercosur. It comes equipped with dual front airbags and safety features such as ABS, traction control, and downhill speed control. During the development phase, it was referred to as the TL Sprint due to reduced industrialization times. Following the launch, electronic stability control (ESC) was also introduced for export models.

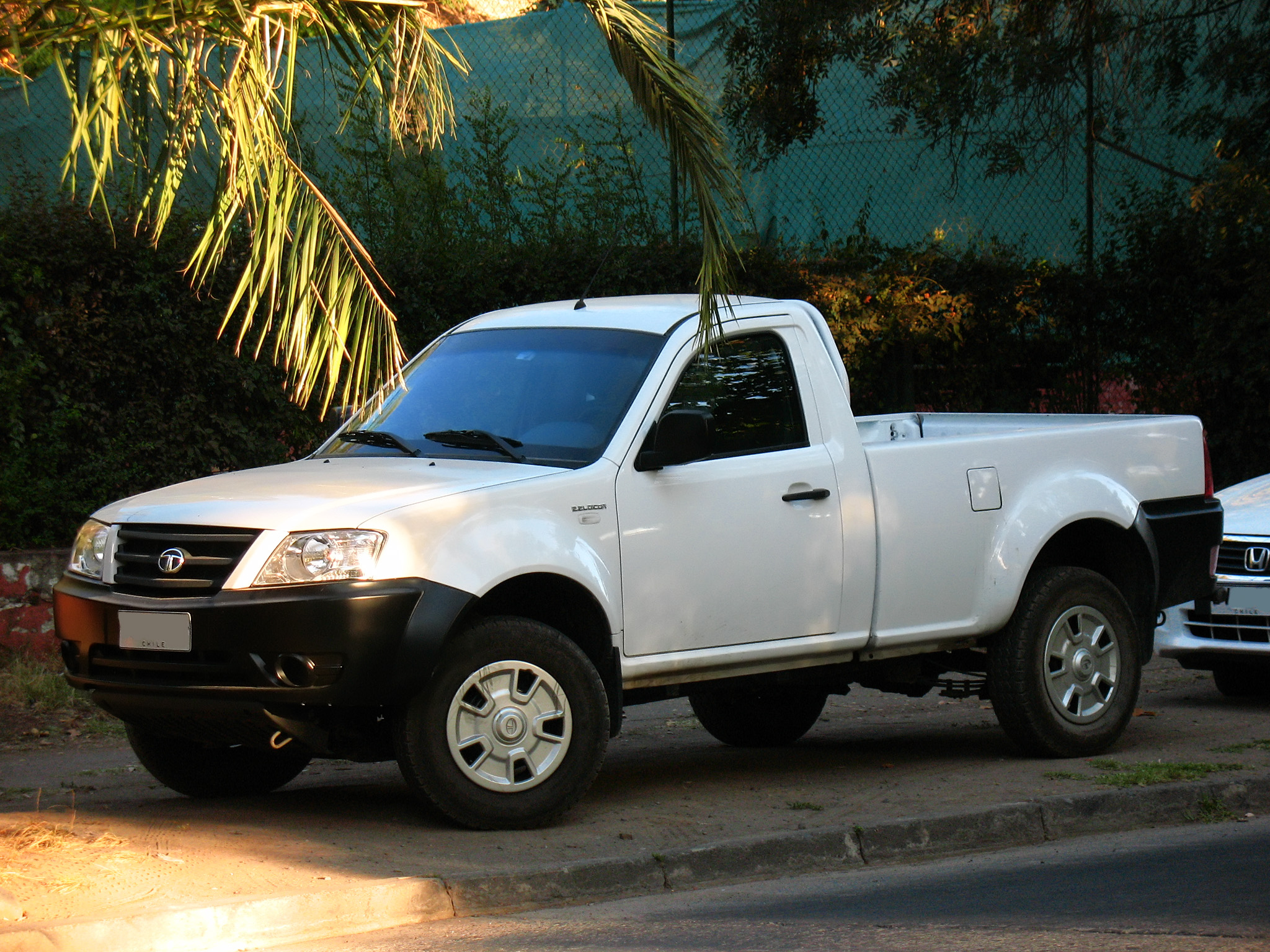
2013 Tata Xenon 2.2 Dicor single cab

The presentation took place in the form of a definitive prototype at the Bologna Motor Show in December 2006, with production starting in May 2007 at the Pune plant (India) and thereafter beginning sales in India, Europe and South Africa. The final name chosen by Tata Motors is Xenon to avoid confusion with the previous Telcoline remaining in production. In Europe, it is equipped with the new 2.2-litre Dicor turbodiesel common rail Euro 4 producing 140 horsepower and a 5-speed manual gearbox.

In India, its revised X2 platform also gave rise to the Tata Sumo Grande.

In 2012, with the introduction of the Euro 5 regulations in Europe, the 2.2 Dicor engine was revised with the introduction of VGT, DPF filter and a power rise to 150 horsepower.

In 2010, the pick up started assembly in Thailand by the Tata-Thonburi joint venture. In 2011, the CNG version was launched in Thailand powered by a new 2,1 litre straight-4 DOHC engine with 115 HP. A Xenon XT (Cross Terrain) double cab 4-door, 5-seater variant was launched in 2009. The Xenon has been well received in Europe, especially in Spain and Italy.

=== Safety ===
The Tata Xenon was tested by the Australasian New Car Assessment Program twice, the first with no ESC and the second a model with ESC.

ANCAP test results Tata Xenon (2013)
Test	Score
Overall	2 /5 stars
Frontal offset	11.27/16
Side impact	16/16
Pole	Not Assessed
Seat belt reminders	0/3
Whiplash protection	Not Assessed
Pedestrian protection	Not Assessed
Electronic stability control	Not available

ANCAP test results Tata Xenon (2013)
Test	Score
Overall	4 /5 stars
Frontal offset	11.27/16
Side impact	16/16
Pole	Not Assessed
Seat belt reminders	0/3
Whiplash protection	Not Assessed
Pedestrian protection	Not Assessed
Electronic stability control	Standard

=== 2017 facelift ===
Xenon Yodha was launched on January 3, 2017, as a facelifted model. Availability includes 4x2 and 4x4 variants as well as single cab and double cab layouts.

=== 2022 facelift ===
A second facelift called Yodha 2.0 was launched in September 2022.

== Sales ==
Year	Thailand
2014	962
2015	738
2016	923
2017	598
2018	447
2019	478
2020	139
2021	52

Tata Telcoline sales in Thailand (100x)
