= Tata Sierra =

Mid-size SUV

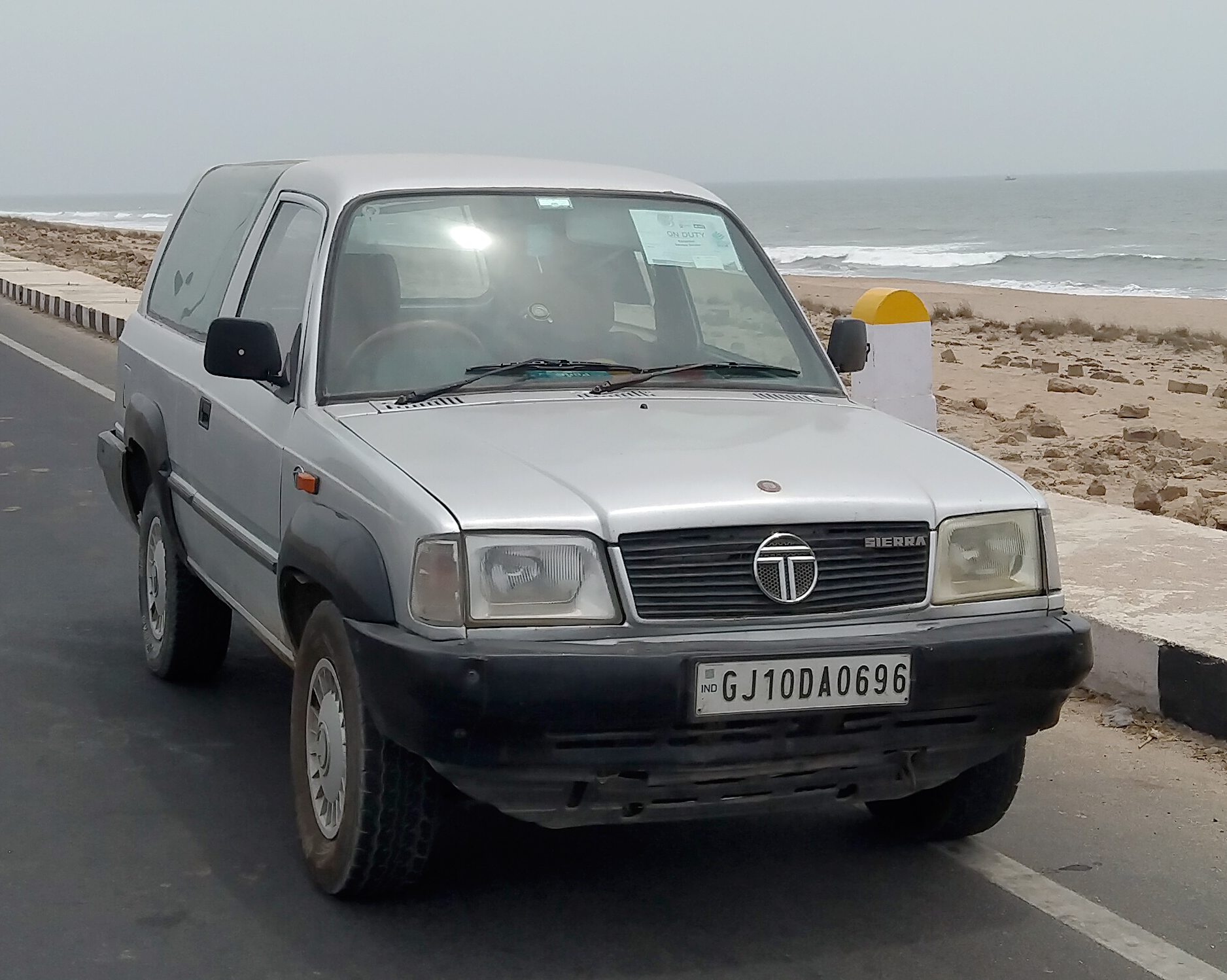

Overview
- Manufacturer: Tata Motors
- Production: 1991–2003; 2025–present
- Assembly: India: Pune

Body and chassis
- Class: Mid-size SUV (1991-2003); Subcompact crossover SUV (2025-Present)
- Body style: 3-door SUV (1991–2003); 5-door SUV (2025)

The Tata Sierra is an SUV produced by the Indian carmaker Tata Motors. The first generation was a mid-size SUV produced from 1991 to 2003, based on the Tata Telcoline, the second generation is a subcompact crossover SUV.

In the export market, the Sierra was sold as Tata Sport, Tata Telcosport, Tata Grand Telcosport and Tata Gurkha.

The second generation Sierra was launched on 25 November 2025. The electric variant of the Sierra will launch in the latter half of 2026.

== First generation (1991) ==
First generation
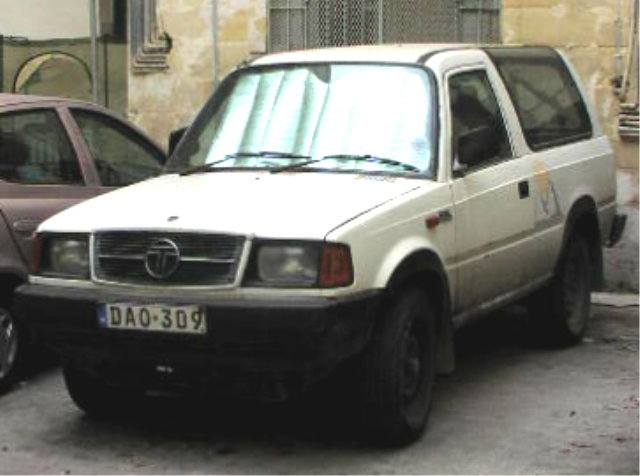

Overview
- Also called: Tata Sport; Tata Telcosport; Tata Grand Telcosport; Tata Gurkha (United Kingdom)
- Production: 1991–2001
- Assembly: India: Pune

Body and chassis
- Layout: Front-engine, rear-wheel-drive Front-engine four-wheel-drive
- Platform: Tata X2
- Related: Tata Estate; Tata Telcoline; Tata Sumo; Tata Safari

Powertrain
- Engine: 2.0 L 483 DL/DLTC I4
- Transmission: 5-speed manual

Dimensions
- Wheelbase: 2,400 mm (94.5 in)
- Length: 4,400 mm (173.2 in)
- Width: 1,730 mm (68.1 in)
- Height: 1,770 mm (69.7 in)

Chronology
- Successor: Tata Safari

The first-generation Sierra was launched in 1991. It was based on the Telcoline. Offered with the 483 DL engine mated with a 5-speed gearbox, with rear-wheel drive. The rear portion was a completely new design with large fixed alpine windows and entry through a front collapsible passenger seat. The rear bumper had plastic shrouds on either end and beveled lamps for illuminating the license plate located at the central recess. The car had body mounted tricolor tail lamp (clear lens-orange-red), and the headlamps came with black bezels, with amber lens turn indicators. The grille had a cheese grater appearance with the circular insignia flanked with two chrome bars. The spare wheel was externally mounted on the rear door and it came with a fabric cover having a stylized version of Tata Sierra written over it. The Sierra received additional soundproofing over the Telcoline, making the interior more comfortable.

=== Facelift (1997) ===
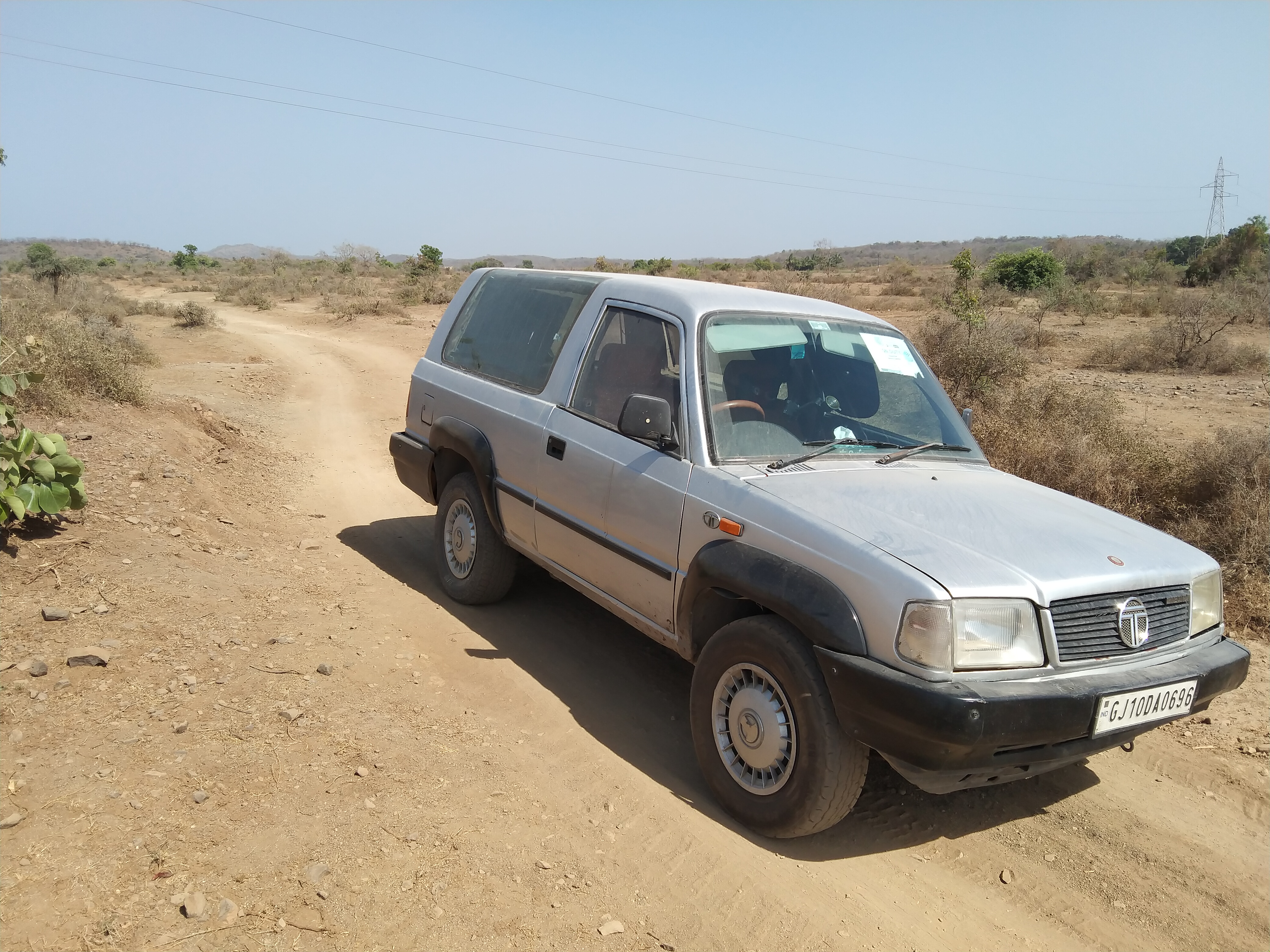
Tata Sierra Facelift

In 1997, as the emission norms became further restricted and customers expected more power, TATA launched a turbocharged version in July–August 1997. The car had the 2.0-liter diesel engine as used earlier, to which a turbocharger (single–stage) was added hence the name 483 DLTC; the new engine was rated Euro 2 and had a maximum output of 87 hp (65 kW). There was a marked visual change on the outside with a new bonnet that was extended further downward above the grille, the grille too was revised, it had just the circular insignia (no chrome bars as earlier). The headlamps were revised too, the bezels were gone and now it became larger and visually more continuous with the indicators. At the rear too there were major revisions, and the car got heated windshields, tail lamps now become two-tone units (red-clear lens), the rear bumper became a completely wrapped-around unit(metal)reaching the rear wheel arches, the now sported additional tail lamp bars, and the registration plate was illuminated by a single bar at the top. The wheel arches were revised too and now became more prominent and large. Internally, the power window motor was changed and the new motor was directly linked instead of being linked via actuating cable. The wheel caps were revised, and so were the optional alloys. The steering became a four-spoke unit, replacing the previous two-spoke one. The car was received well by the media and saw increased demand globally. The seats were provided by Harita Grammar Ltd. and later by Tata Johnson Ltd.

=== Engine ===
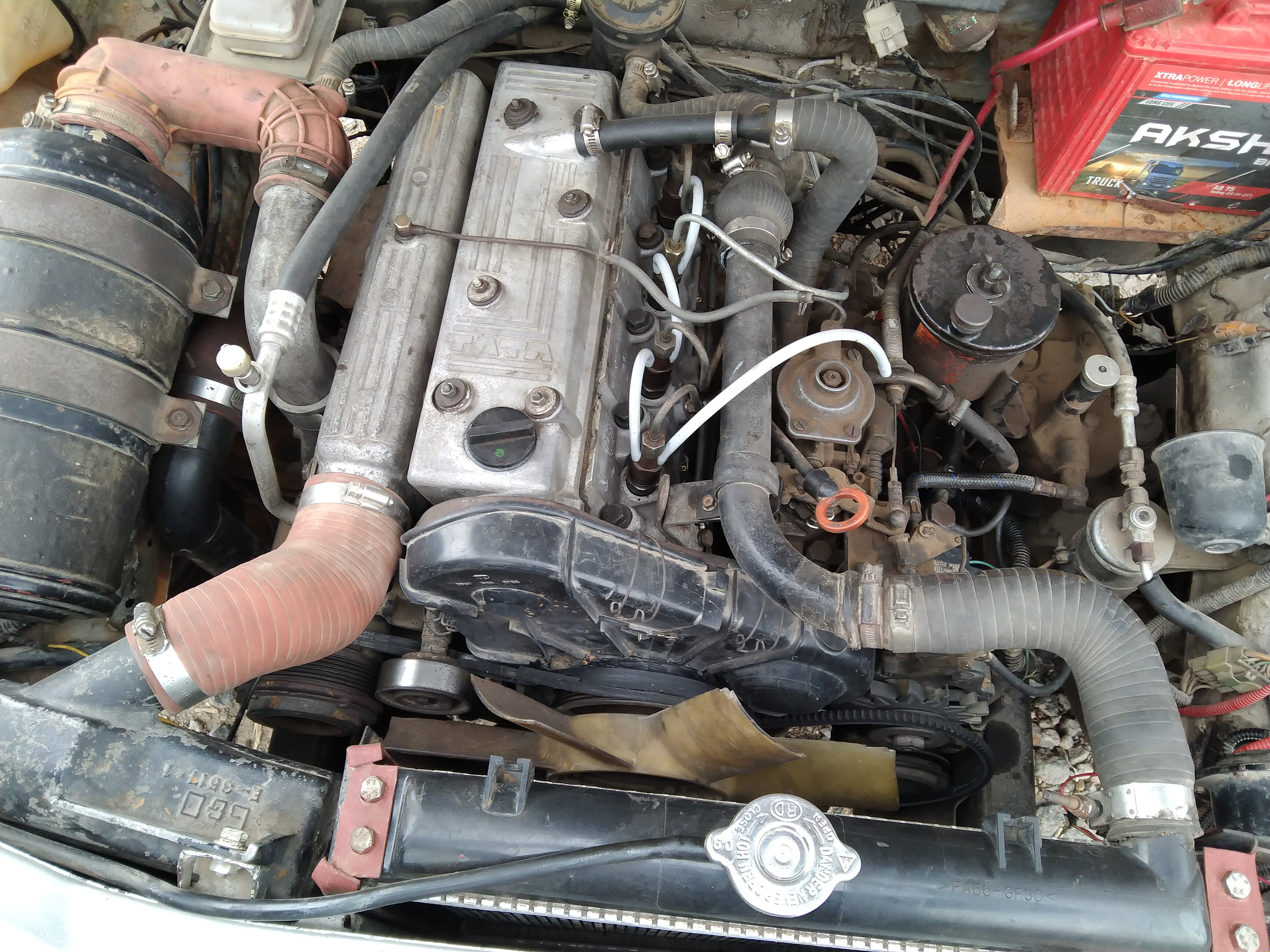
483 DLTC engine in a Sierra DX

The engine was the same as the Telcoline: the 2.0-liter 483 DL four-cylinder diesel engine developed by Tata Motors in India. It has two valves per cylinder and indirect injection with pre-chamber and develops 63 PS (46 kW). The gearbox is a G76 5-speed manual. The later Turbo model was powered by a 483DLTC (DLTC stands for "diesel turbocharged") inline-four engine with 90 PS (66 kW) at 4,300 rpm. Later, this engine was also used on the Tata Sumo, Safari, and Winger (Van).

The Sierra was available only with four seats; it also offered extra equipment such as electric windows, air conditioning, an adjustable steering wheel, and tachometer.

=== Exports ===
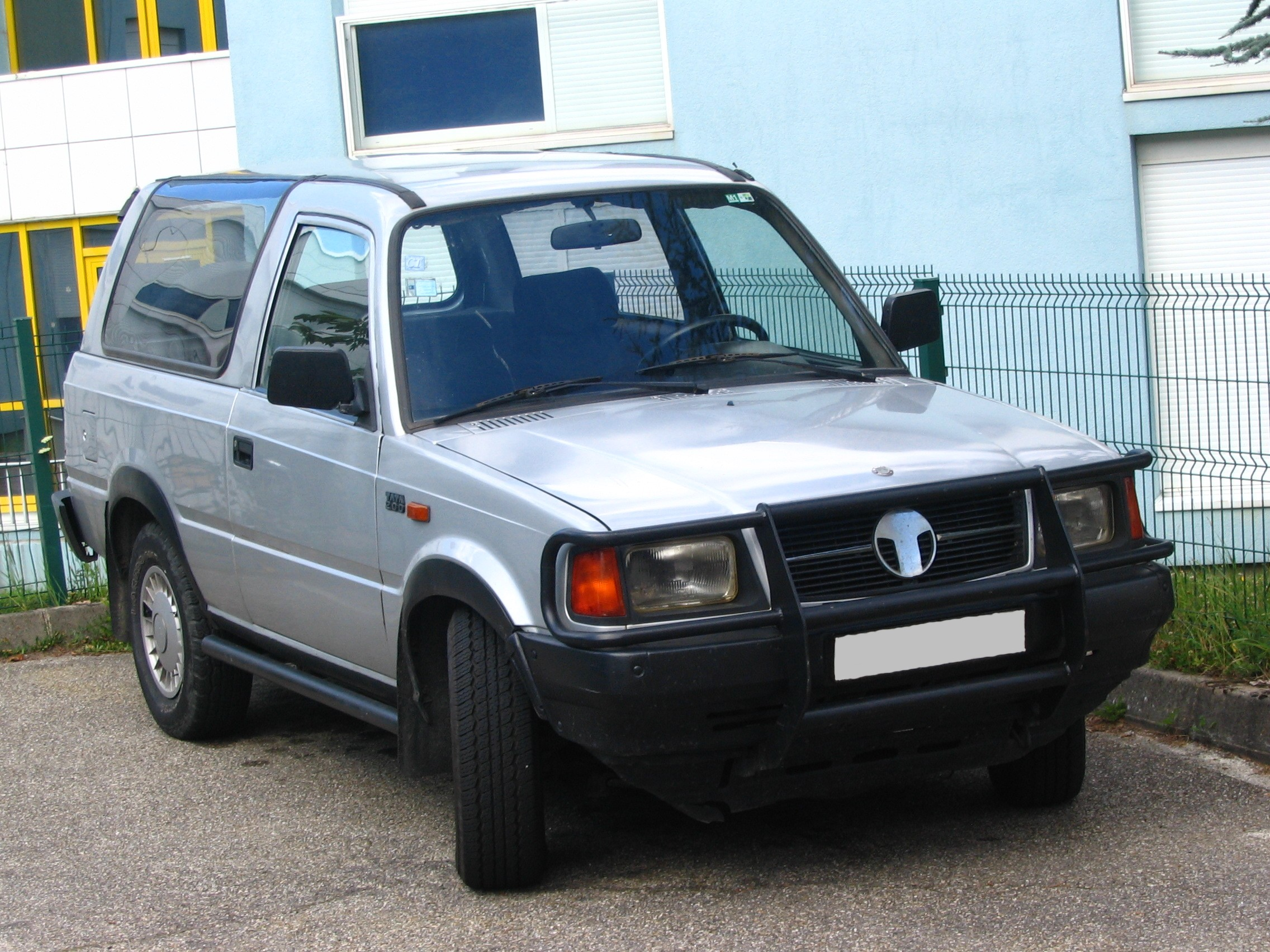
Tata Telcosport (France)

In Europe (especially in Spain, France, Germany, and Italy), the Sierra was imported in 1994 under the name Tata Sport or Tata Telcosport) in a single version with the 2.0L diesel engine Euro 2 in the rear wheel drive variant, while the 4x4 was added in April 1998 proposed with the 2.0L turbodiesel. With the introduction of the turbodiesel engine, the name was changed to Tata Grand Telcosport in more markets like Spain. In Italy the Sierra was sold as a Tata Sport in two versions: base and Orciari, the latter exclusive for Italy was made by the Italian designer Orciari and featured an enriched endowment, two-tone bodywork, roof bars, and specific interior finishes.

== Second generation (2025) ==
Second generation

Overview
- Also called: Tata Styzor (South Africa)
- Production: November 2025–present

Powertrain
- Engine: Petrol: 1.5 L Hyperion T-GDi I4; 1.5 L Revotron I4; Diesel: 1.5 L Kryojet turbo I4
- Transmission: 6-speed manual (in Diesel and Revotron MPi); 7-speed DCA (in Revotron MPI); 6-speed AT (in Diesel and Hyperion)

Dimensions
- Wheelbase: 2,730 mm (107 in)
- Length: 4,340 mm (171 in)
- Width: 1,841 mm (72.5 in)
- Height: 1,715 mm (67.5 in)

The second generation Sierra was unveiled on 17 January 2025 at the Bharat Mobility Global Expo (Auto Expo) 2025. It includes concepts for both internal combustion engine (ICE) and electric vehicle (EV) variants, with the ICE version launching on 25 November 2025. The electric variant of the Sierra will launch in the latter half of 2026

At the 2020 Auto Expo, Tata Motors showcased an EV concept named Tata Sierra EV. The concept featured a characteristic fixed panoramic rear window pane similar to the first- and second-generation Sierra, along with an additional sliding door for access to the rear lounge-like seating arrangement. It was based on Tata's ALFA (Advanced Modular Platform) architecture.

The 2025 concept updates the EV concept to the Gen 2 Acti.ev platform, while the ICE variant uses the Atlas architecture. The Tata Sierra EV concept revives the Sierra as an electric SUV, drawing inspiration from the original models while incorporating modern electric vehicle technology. It is positioned as a key addition to Tata Motors' EV lineup. It is intended to compete with midsize SUVs, like the Hyundai Creta, Kia Seltos, Maruti Suzuki Grand Vitara and more.

=== Engine ===
The Sierra is powered by a 1.5-litre four-cylinder engine producing 78 kW (105 hp) and 145 N⋅m (107 lb⋅ft) of torque, offered with either a seven-speed dual-clutch automatic transmission or six-speed manual.

=== Sierra EV ===
The all-electric Sierra EV launched in India on 30 June 2026, priced from ₹18.79 lakh (US$20,000) to ₹25.99 lakh (US$28,000) (ex-showroom). It is offered with 63 kWh and 75 kWh battery options in rear-wheel-drive or dual-motor all-wheel-drive configurations, built on Tata's Gen 2 Acti.ev platform; the ICE model uses a separate Atlas architecture. Claimed MIDC range is up to 665 km.

=== Safety ===
Bharat NCAP test results Tata Sierra (2026, based on Latin NCAP 2016)
Test	Score	Stars
Adult occupant protection	31.14/32.00	5 /5 stars
Child occupant protection	44.73/49.00	5 /5 stars

Bharat NCAP test results Tata Sierra.ev (2026, based on Latin NCAP 2016)
Test	Score	Stars
Adult occupant protection	30.62/32.00	5 /5 stars
Child occupant protection	45.00/49.00	5 /5 stars
