= LDV Pilot =

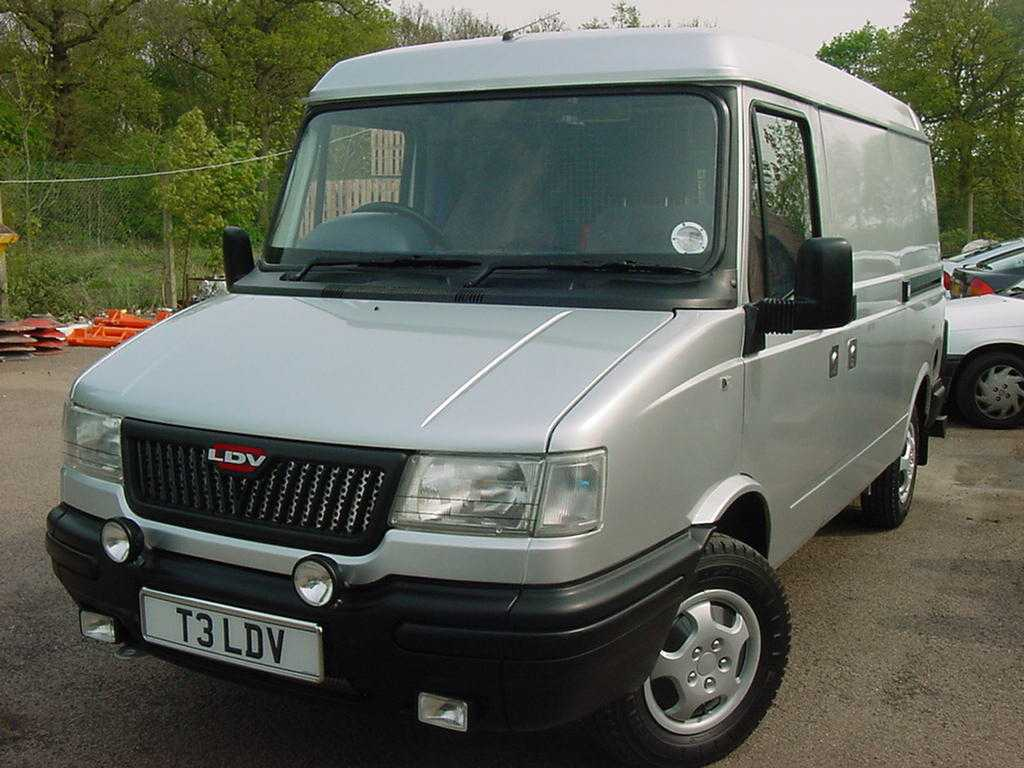
- 1999 LDV Pilot

Overview
- Manufacturer: LDV Limited
- Production: 1974–1996 (original); 1996–2005
- Assembly: United Kingdom: Birmingham

Body and chassis
- Class: Van
- Related: LDV Convoy

Chronology
- Predecessor: Morris J4; Morris 250 JU
- Successor: LDV Maxus

The Leyland DAF Vans Pilot was the final model in a series of panel vans produced from 1974 to 2005, originally launched as the 1974 Leyland Sherpa, which was developed by the Austin-Morris division of British Leyland and in turn derived from earlier light commercial vehicles produced by the British Motor Corporation.

The Pilot was available in capacities from 2.2 to 2.6 tonnes in a 5.7 cubic metres (200 cu ft) load area. Power came from a 1.9 litre Peugeot diesel engine driving the rear wheels through a five speed gearbox. Access to the load area is from either the rear or a sliding side door.

== History ==
Derived from the Morris/BMC J4 and JU250 vans of the 1960s, the core vehicle went through a series of developments, the main one being the revision of the forward control layout of the J4 and moving the engine ahead of the cab and accessible via a bonnet, bringing Leyland's light van offering into line with its two main competitors in the domestic market; namely the Ford Transit and Bedford CF. This allowed the wheelbase to be extended resulting in greater stability, payload, side loading and the distinctive 'Sherpa' profile (though the last of the J4s and the first Sherpa are largely identical from the rear).

The Sherpa gave way to the Freight Rover 200 Series and in turn the Leyland DAF 200 Series before finally becoming the Pilot after LDV was formed in 1993. It was originally designed to be built on car production lines which led to it having a narrow track. The van's resulting narrower profile was made into a virtue in later publicity by stressing its ability in narrow city streets and lanes – this indeed was why the Sherpa and its successors was for many years preferred over the Ford Transit by the Royal Mail and British Telecom (BT) - the former in particular were major users of the Sherpa through all of its later generations and purchased huge fleets.

=== Sherpa (1974–1982) ===
Leyland Sherpa
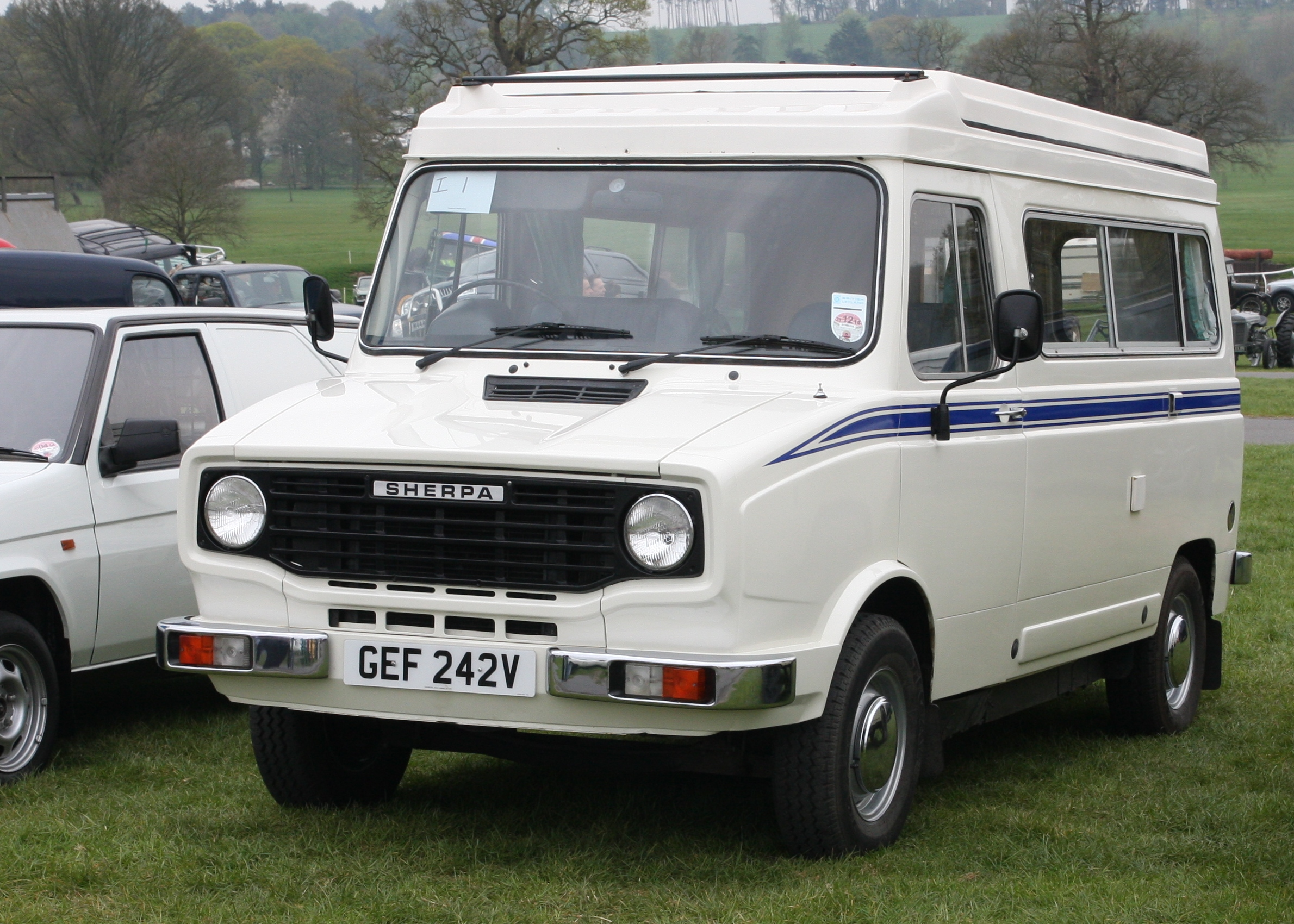

Overview
- Manufacturer: British Leyland (Austin Morris)
- Also called: Freight Rover Sherpa; Morris Sherpa
- Production: 1974–1982

Body and chassis
- Class: Van

Chronology
- Predecessor: Morris J4; Morris 250 JU

Originally developed by British Leyland, the model was launched in 1974 under the nameplate Leyland Van. Later renamed Sherpa, it was sold under a succession of marque names reflecting the turbulent times at British Leyland during the 1970s - being sold as a Leyland, Morris, Austin-Morris and then finally as the Freight Rover Sherpa.

The initial Sherpa line up consisted of vans in 185, 215 and 240 versions (where 185 denotes a GVW of 1.85 tons, and so on); pick ups in 215 and 240 versions; a 240 crewbus and minibus; and various chassis cab options in 220 and 250 versions. Payloads were quoted as 13/14cwt for the 185; 18/19cwt for the 215 and 220; and 22/23cwt for the 240 and 250. Loadspace, at 190 cubic feet (5.4 m^{3}), was considerably larger than that of the J4 and only just short of the Morris 250 JU.

In 1978 the 1.7 and 2.0 litre O series engines replaced the original 1622 cc and 1798 cc B series petrol units, while the 1798 cc B series diesel stayed put. The range was redesignated accordingly: vans: 200, 230 and 250; pick ups: 230 and 250; minibus and crewbus: 250 only; chassis cab: 255 only. The petrol 2.0 required a negligible premium over the 1.7, a mere £50 (equivalent to £178 in 2025), with fuel consumption remaining the same and drivability being considerably improved. Power for the 1.7 petrol was 45.5 kW (61 bhp; 62 PS). A few months after the engine changes, the Sherpa was rebadged as a Morris. In 1981, BL created the Freight Rover division as part of the Land Rover group, so the Sherpa's badges were changed again.

=== Sherpa K2 Series (1982–1984) ===
Freight Rover Sherpa
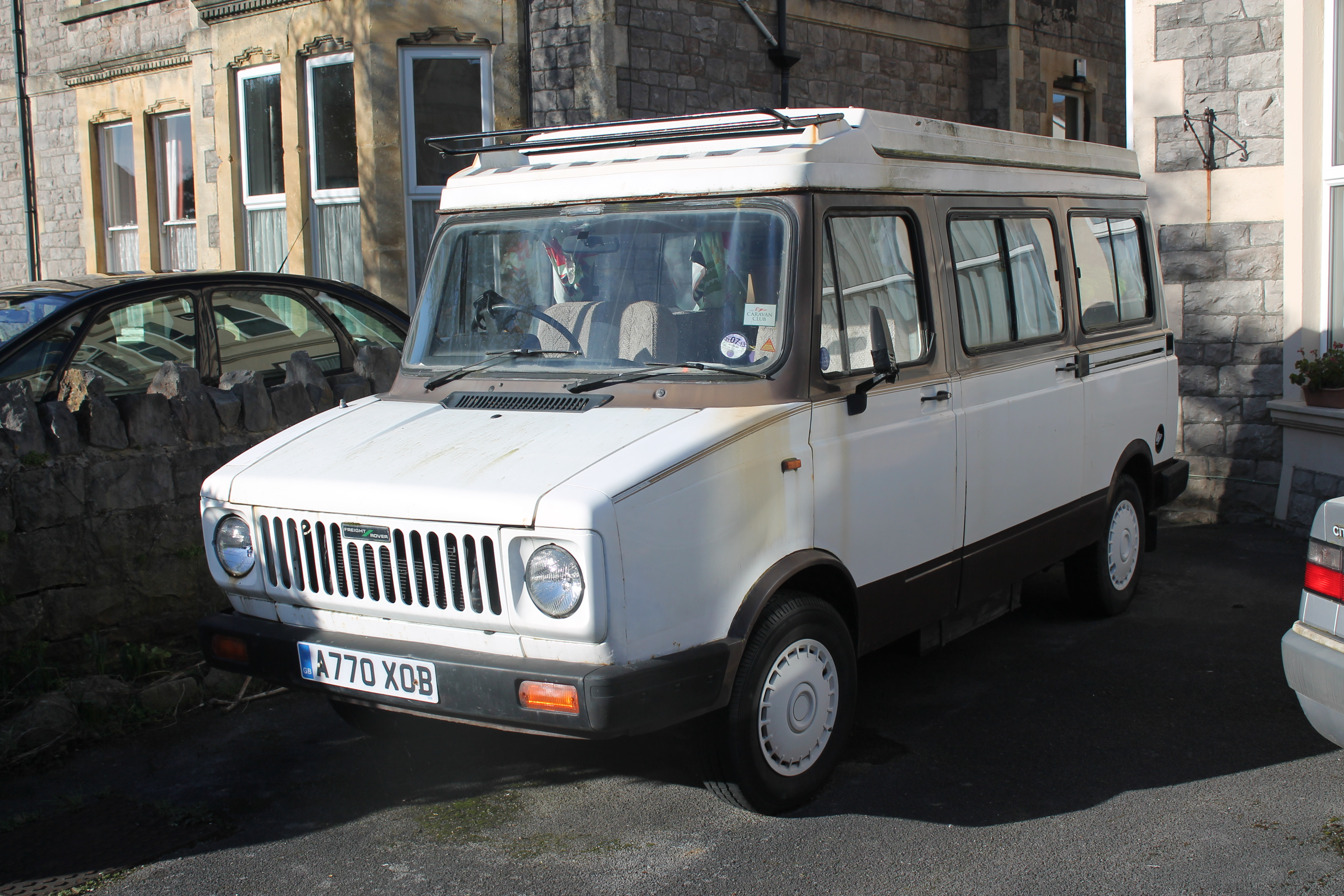

Overview
- Manufacturer: Freight Rover
- Production: 1982–1984

Body and chassis
- Class: Van

Chronology
- Predecessor: Leyland Sherpa
- Successor: Freight Rover 200 Series

With export sales dropping dramatically and the Sherpa losing market share to the Transit and other, newer competitors, British Leyland seriously considered letting the Sherpa wither on the vine and exiting the sector. But, instead, a limited program of updates was launched and the short lived Sherpa K2 made its first appearance in June 1982. It had a neater appearance (using a black vertically slatted grille which gave it a family resemblance to the Range Rover) and much improved side access to the load bay. Driver comfort and NVH levels were particular targets for improvement. One major difference, although not easily noticed, was new doors and B-pillar; the B-pillar on the original model leaned slightly forward (a legacy from the Morris J4 derived bodyshell), obscuring the driver's vision and hindering access. The side window was also enlarged, as were the windows on the rear doors.

The Sherpa van could now be bought in 200, 230, 250 and 280 versions, reflecting the maximum GVW in tens of kilograms - 200 meaning 2 tonnes, 230 signifying 2.3, and so on. The crewbus and minibus continued in 250 form. Loadspace remained at 190 cubic feet (5.4 m^{3}), but a new "Hi Capacity" walk thru body was also offered, built on either the 255 or 280 chassis cab, and offering 330 cubic feet (9.3 m^{3}) of loadspace. An optional Luton body took loadspace up to 460 cubic feet (13 m^{3}), again with a choice of basic chassis cab GVWs.

The original, integral pick up had now been dropped in favour of a dropside pick up built on the Sherpa chassis-cab. The 255 and 280 chassis cabs were also available on their own, ready to receive bespoke bodywork. Engine availability continued unaltered, with 1.7 and 2.0 litre O series petrol units, the 1.8 litre B series diesel and the option of a Landi-Hartog LPG conversion, first introduced at the launch of Freight Rover the year before. A 4WD Sherpa van was also now offered.

=== Freight Rover 200 Series (1984–1989) ===
Freight Rover 200 Series
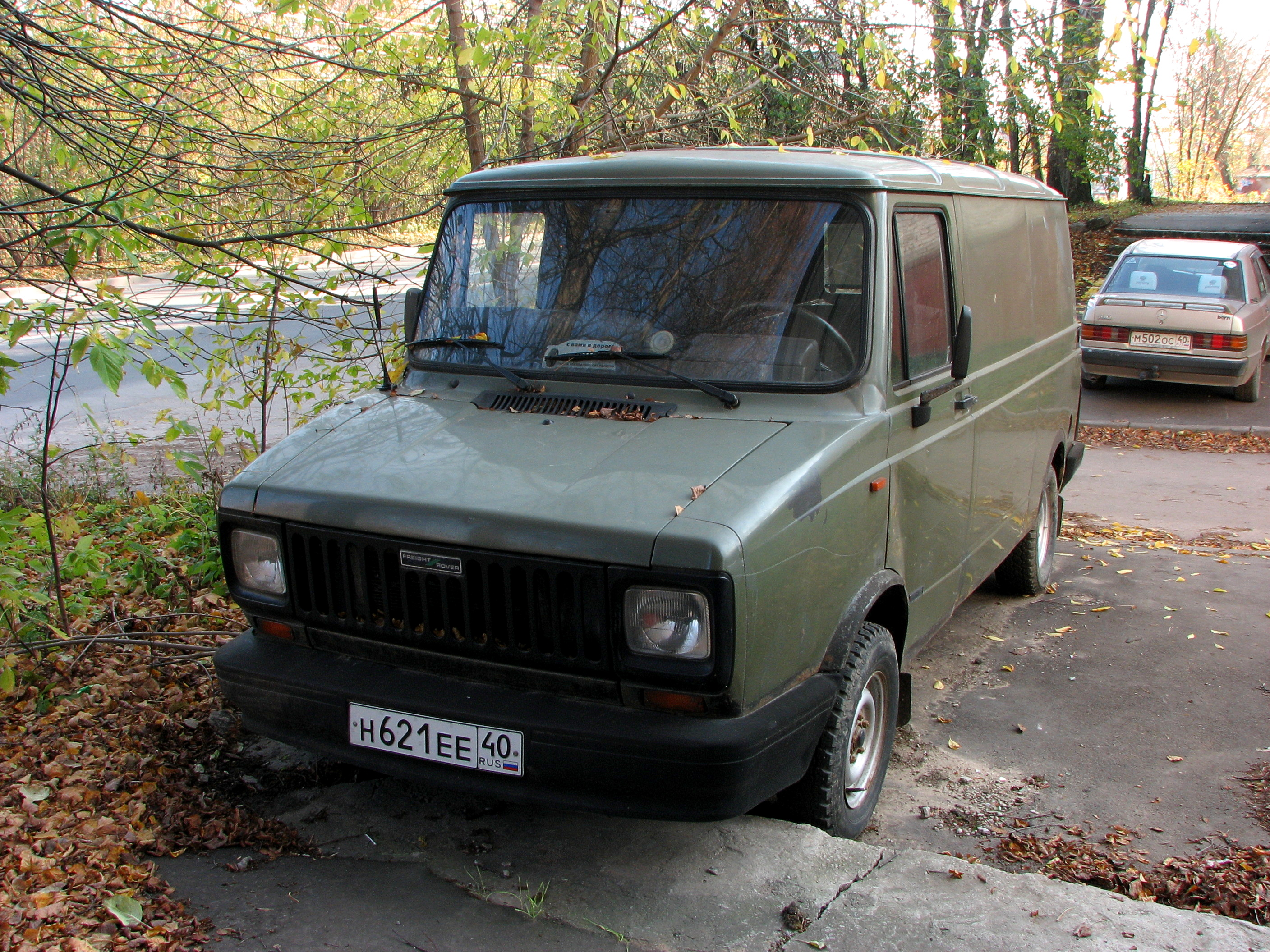

Overview
- Manufacturer: Freight Rover
- Production: 1984–1989

Body and chassis
- Class: Van
- Related: Freight Rover 300 Series

Chronology
- Predecessor: Freight Rover Sherpa
- Successor: Leyland DAF 200 Series

With the next facelift, the Sherpa (now known as the Freight Rover 200 series) gained square headlamps, new bumpers and repositioned indicators. Alongside the original bodystyle there was new wide bodied variant called the 300 Series. The 200 Series was initially available with a two tonne GVW. The capacity for the 200 series remained at 190 cubic feet (5.4 m^{3}).

A Luton style body was offered, built on the 255 chassis cab, providing a capacity of 400 cubic feet (11 m^{3}), and a maximum payload of almost two tonnes. The chassis cab also formed the basis for drop side pick ups, in 255, 280 and 285 versions, again available with either short or long wheelbases. Of course, the chassis cab could also be ordered on its own, again in a choice of lengths, so that bespoke bodywork could be fitted, with the added option of either single or double cabs. The 200 series continued to be offered as minibus or crewbus.

While the K2 Sherpa's engines remained available (including the ancient B series diesel), a 2.5 litre diesel unit was now offered on the 300 series. The B series diesel bowed out in November 1986 for the 200 series, being then replaced by the 2.0 NA direct injection Diesel Rover MDi / Perkins Prima, (as found in Austin Maestros and in turbocharged form in Austin Montegos and late Maestros (from 1992 to 1994) which was effectively a dieselised BL O series engine.

This was a somewhat raucous, noisy and unrefined engine but was however a very reliable unit capable of excellent fuel economy, although the performance of the naturally aspirated engine was not a strong point. As a city van it was adequate but totally unsuitable for motorway work due to the noise levels. At the same point, the O-series 1.7 and 2.0 Petrol engines were given an upgrade becoming the O2.

A low compression version of the Rover 3.5 litre V8 unit (taken from Land Rover) also became available on certain versions of the 300 Series (with a modified drivetrain) from 1986, producing 132 horsepower (98 kW). This version was designed for emergency services and express delivery operators, and was bought in large numbers by the police and ambulance services. Economy was very poor with this engine, with a claimed figure of only 14.1 miles per imperial gallon (20.0 l/100 km).

However, with the sale of Freight Rover in 1989, the Rover Group left this sector of the light commercial market.

=== Leyland DAF 200 Series (1989–1993) ===
Leyland DAF 200 Series
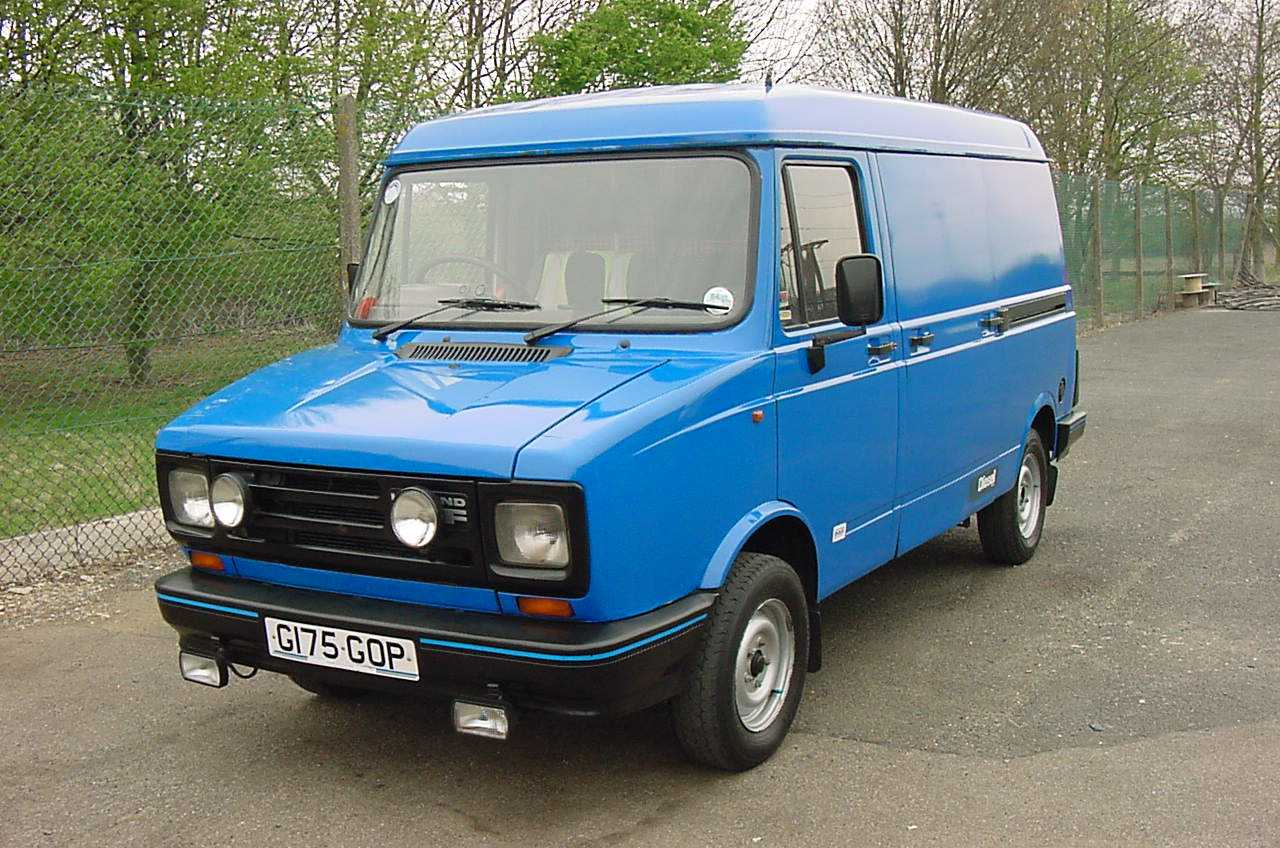

Overview
- Manufacturer: Leyland DAF
- Also called: DAF 200 Series; Leyland Cargo
- Production: 1989–1996

Body and chassis
- Class: Van
- Related: Leyland DAF 400 Series

Chronology
- Predecessor: Freight Rover 200 Series
- Successor: LDV Pilot

With Freight Rover becoming Leyland DAF, the 200 Series was given a new radiator grille, bearing the Leyland DAF badge. The 200 Series continued to be built on car lines and its narrow width meant it became a very popular city van. The last 200s switched from the Perkins Prima engine to the less economical but more refined, naturally aspirated indirect injection PSA XUD 1.9-litre diesel engine.

=== LDV 200 Series (1993–1996) ===
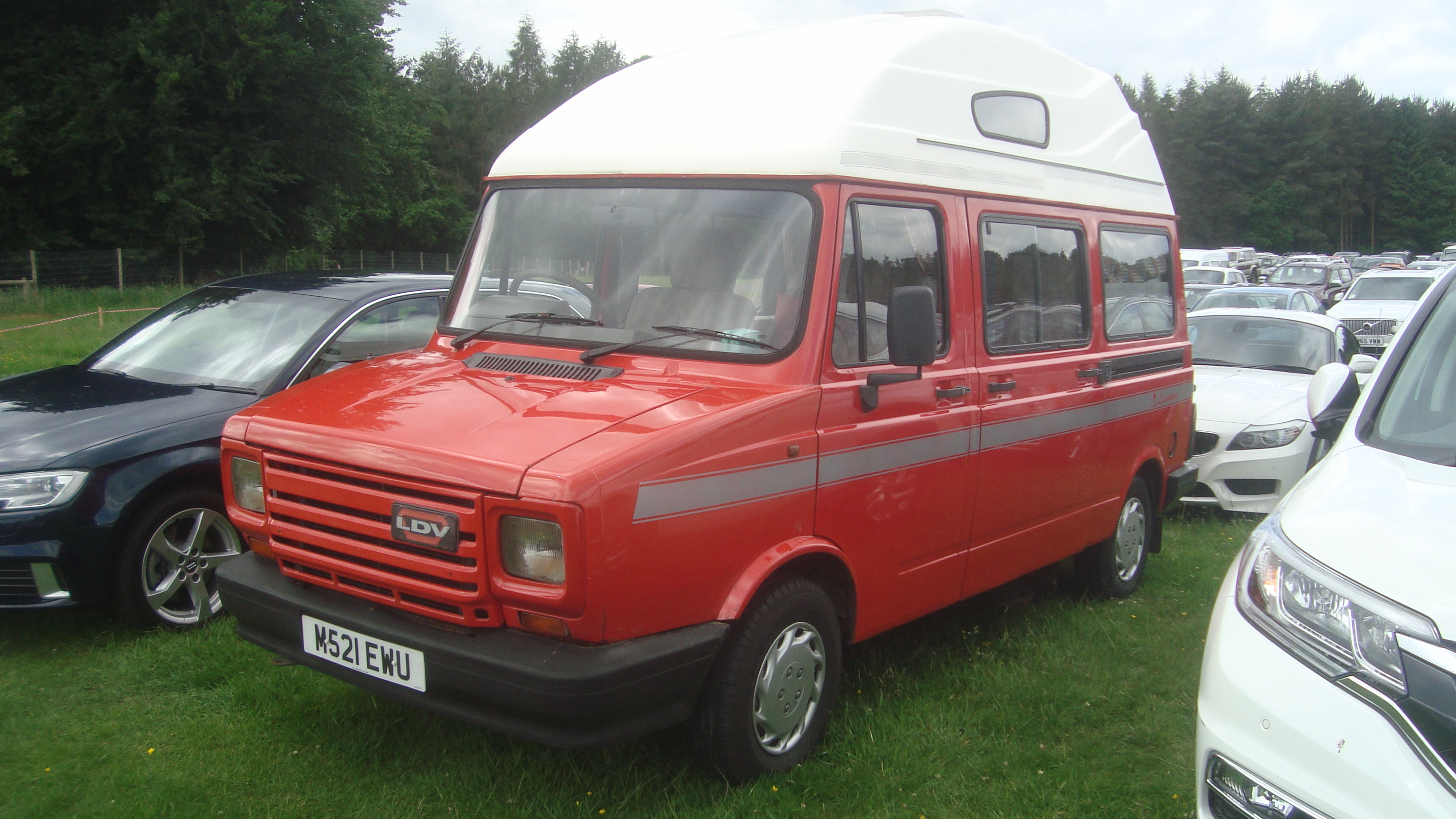
LDV 200 campervan

Following the sell off of the van business from the insolvent Leyland DAF in 1993, LDV Limited was formed.

=== LDV Pilot (1996–2005) ===
LDV Pilot
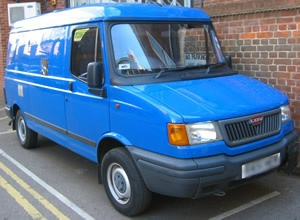
- LDV Pilot

Overview
- Manufacturer: LDV Limited
- Production: 1996–2005

Body and chassis
- Class: Van
- Related: LDV Convoy

Chronology
- Predecessor: Leyland DAF 200 Series
- Successor: LDV Maxus

In 1996, the van received a major facelift with softened front styling - although its relationship with the original Sherpa of the 1970s was still very evident. There was also a redesigned dashboard and seating and the van was renamed the Pilot. The facelift also saw the end of the '80s Rover stalks, but not the instruments and minor switchgear.

The van became popular as a minibus, and was available in pick up and fleet based vans, as well as being used by the army for transporting troops. Power arrived in the form of a Peugeot 1905cc diesel engine throughout the entire range, however it made the Pilot sluggish and only able to achieve 75 mph (121 km/h) (One of the rare versions with the turbocharged version of this engine was an altogether more satisfying drive).

It also had little torque meaning most hills required the driver to change down. Early models have basic interiors consisting of two or three seats, Mountain Blue coloured plastic dashboard and LDV branded FM/AM cassette radio. Gears are selected using the now unpopular floor mounted gear stick. The van was also used by various police forces and the Royal Mail.

== Turkish variant ==
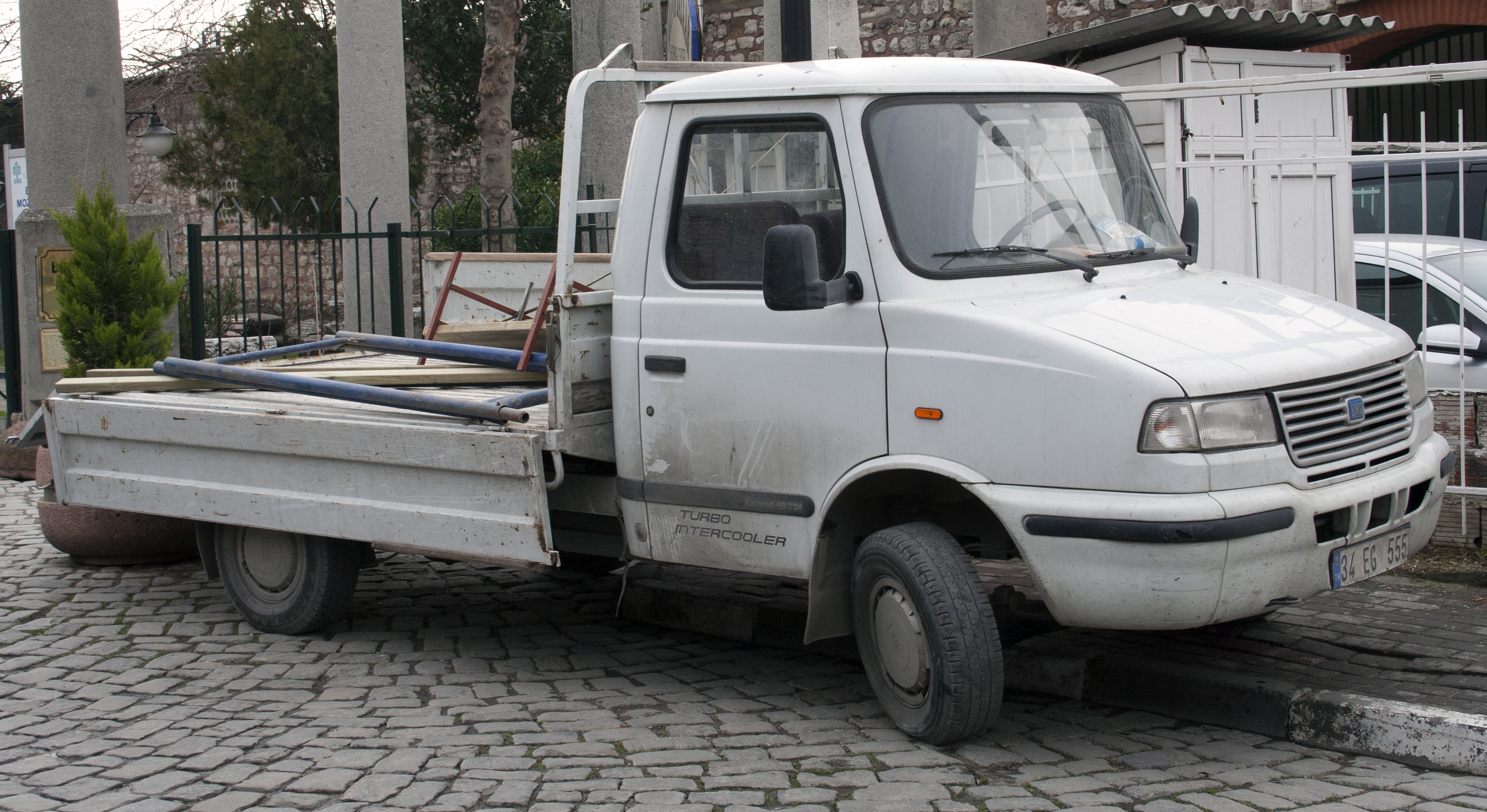
A Turkish-made BMC Levend 80 TDI Turbo Intercooler

A Sherpa-derived van was also produced in Turkey by BMC Sanayi ve Ticaret A.S. as the BMC Levend. As of 2006, a pick up derivative was also sold. This was not promoted in the United Kingdom, or outside of Turkey in general. "Levend" is an old Ottoman term for a class of seamen, but was also a pejorative term for a type of irregular infantry referred to as "an uncontrollable rabble."

== Kit car ==
A short lived Sherpa 200 derived Kit Car produced by Sherpley Motors of Loughborough was manufactured from a point in the 1980s to 2007, first being reported in Which Kit of October 1997.

The kit was engineered to loosely resemble a vintage Bentley. The early Speed Six design just used Sherpa axles and suspension, fitted to a custom chassis and mated to an engine of buyer's choice before being fitted with an Aluminium and fiberglass fabricated body; the later Speed Four model used the complete Sherpa 200 chassis and running gear (and occasionally engine) to enable it to pass the stricter SVA rules imposed after 1999.

The vehicle did not prove to be popular, and only 17 examples of the Sherpley were manufactured between these dates; the last one known to be sold still in kit form was advertised on eBay in 2013, prior to being sold privately for an undisclosed sum.

== See also ==
- LDV Limited
- LDV Convoy
- LDV Maxus
