= Standard (Indian automobile) =

Indian car brand

Standard Motor Products of India Limited
- Type: Automobile manufacturer
- Industry: Automotive
- Founded: 1948
- Defunct: 2006
- Fate: dissolved
- Headquarters: Perungalathur, Chennai, Tamil Nadu, India
- Products: Automobiles; Commercial Vehicles
- Number of employees: n/a

Standard was an Indian brand of automobile which was produced by Standard Motor Products of India Limited (SMPIL) in Madras from 1951 to 1988. Indian Standards were variations of vehicles made in the United Kingdom by Standard-Triumph. Standard Motor Products of India Ltd. (STAMPRO) was incorporated in 1948, a company formed by Union Company (Motors) Ltd. and the British Standard Motor Company. Their first product was the Standard Vanguard. The company was dissolved in 2006 and the old plant was torn down.

== History ==
The first locally built Standard Vanguards were finished in 1951, built in Standard Motors' Vandalur (a suburb of Madras) factory.

From 1955, versions of the Standard Eight and Ten were produced, with ever-increasing local content. The Pennant joined in 1959, although it too was curiously branded "Standard 10" and devoid of bootlid trimwork. The Tens and later Heralds and Gazels all used versions of the 948 cc Standard-Triumph four-cylinder engine. In 1961 production began of the Triumph Herald, known as the Standard Herald in India.

Standard also built a range of light commercial vehicles based on the Standard Atlas/20 (later Leyland 20), called the Standard Twenty. They were sold with the advertising slogan "Standard Twenty can do plenty". For these, production of diesel engines began in India, later exported back to the UK for use in the refurbished Carbodies FX4Q London cabs. In spite of a production lineup incorporating passenger cars as well as light commercials, production was always low. In the fiscal year 1974/1975, for instance, only 1,393 units were built. The Twenty was later updated with locally developed angular bodywork.

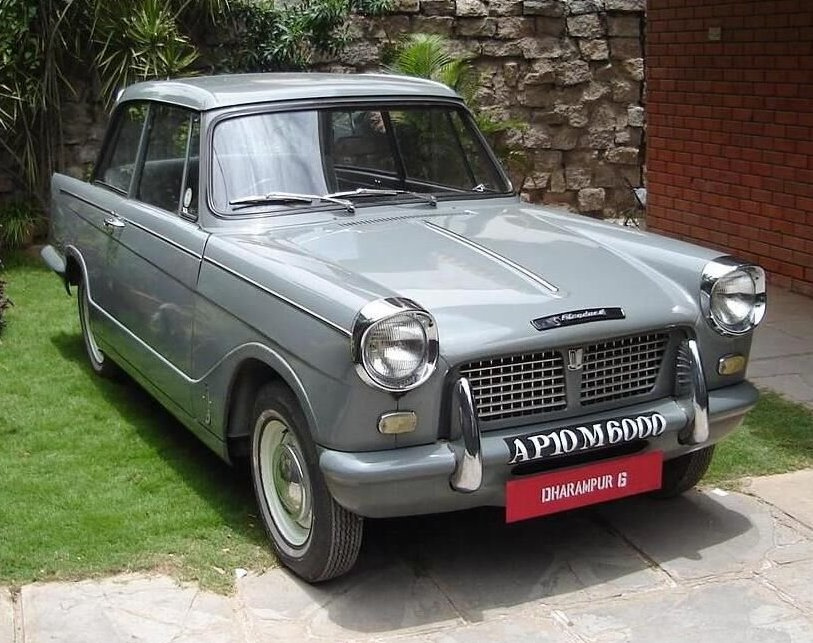
1965 Standard Herald Mark I

Annual production of passenger cars reached about 3,000 units in the early 1970s, but production dropped steadily throughout the decade and only 161 cars were finished in 1976. By 1980, production was down to six cars and thereafter the company reported annual outputs of single cars for many years, reportedly only carried out so as to keep the licence active.

== Herald ==
Badged in the Indian market as the Standard Herald, the Herald was originally heavily dependent on British parts, but as these were gradually replaced by indigenous items specifications and trim as local content increased. By 1965 engines, gearboxes, and axles were all made in India. In 1966 the Standard Herald Mark II was introduced, which featured the bonnet and front end of the Vitesse, but strangely with the outer pair of headlights blocked off and the parking lights cum side-indicators incorporated there instead. In anticipation of the Mark III, very late Mk IIs featured modified rear bodywork (different roofline and a bootlid without a recess).

The new Standard Herald Mark III, made from 1968 to 1971, received a unique indigenously developed four-door body, to meet the demands of Indian buyers (with large families) and competition from the Ambassador and Fiat 1100 (both of which featured four doors). The engine remained the same though, with a claimed top speed of 109–112 km/h (68–70 mph). In 1969-1970 a very few Herald Mark III Companions were built, five-door estates with fibreglass roofs and tailgates. The "Companion" nameplate hearkens back to the Standard Ten-based Companion introduced in 1955.

== Gazel ==
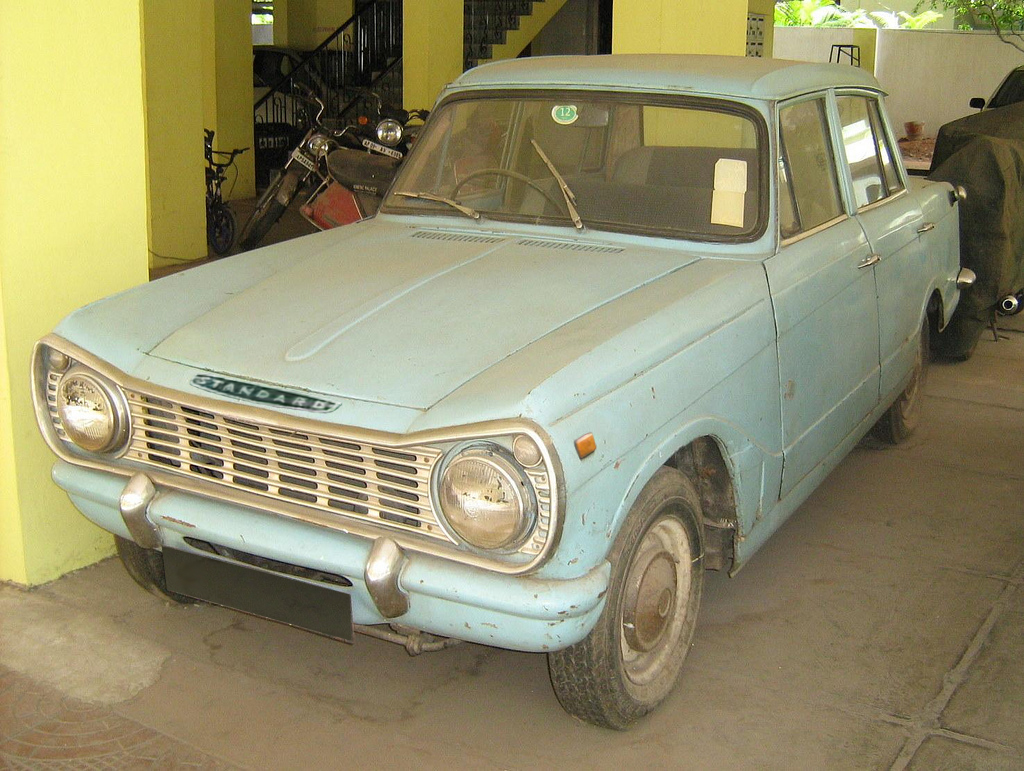
Mark II Gazel, with smaller bonnet

In 1972, the Standard Herald was redesigned with a new body, new suspension, and a new differential. This was a milestone for the Indian car industry with the Standard Gazel being the first car redesigned and re-engineered in India . The exterior changes included a new front facia with a different grille and headlight setup similar to the Triumph Herald 13/60. A new rear end removed the tail fins of the Herald and the taillights were changed to a rectangular design used by other vehicle manufacturers. The mechanical upgrades included a live rear-axle suspended on two leaf springs, allegedly copied from the Triumph Toledo. The interior had the previous model's front bucket seats with a bench seat, and a replacement of the shifter which was also used on the Standard Ten. There were no changes under the hood from the previous model.

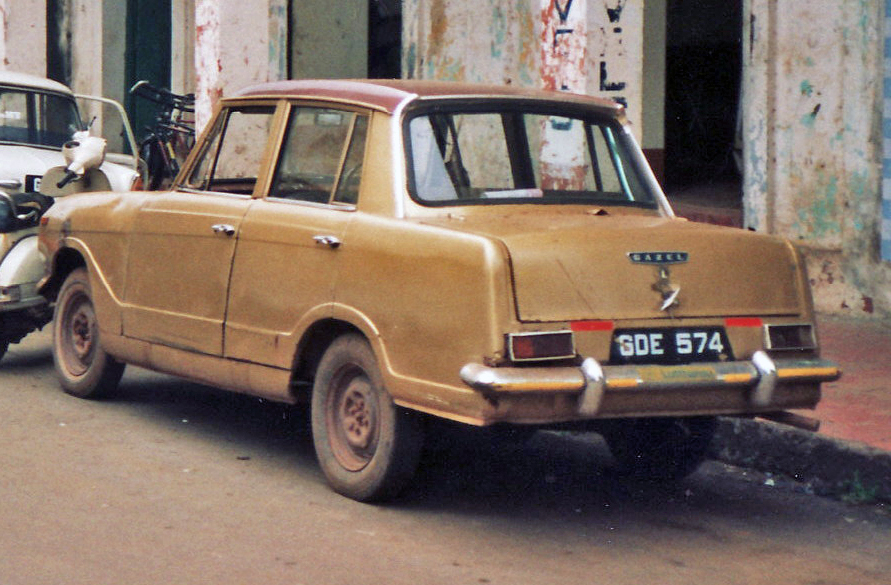
Rear view of the four-door Gazel

The Gazel continued in production in until 1974 when the updated Mark II model was introduced. The car received a 'standard' bonnet, hinged at the rear, instead of the forward lifting front end that dated back to the Herald. This was likely due to the bonnets opening on either or both sides, especially on rough roads. The change increased the weight of the car due to the additional reinforcement needed on the front panel due to the new bonnet.

A small number of estate versions were produced. These cars featured a fiberglass tail-gate that utilised the rear windscreen of the saloon.

Production of the model ended in 1979, however twelve additional cars were built in the 1980s. The end of the line was a single car built in 1983. There was an interregnum of car production until the Rover SD1 based Standard 2000.

== Standard 2000 ==
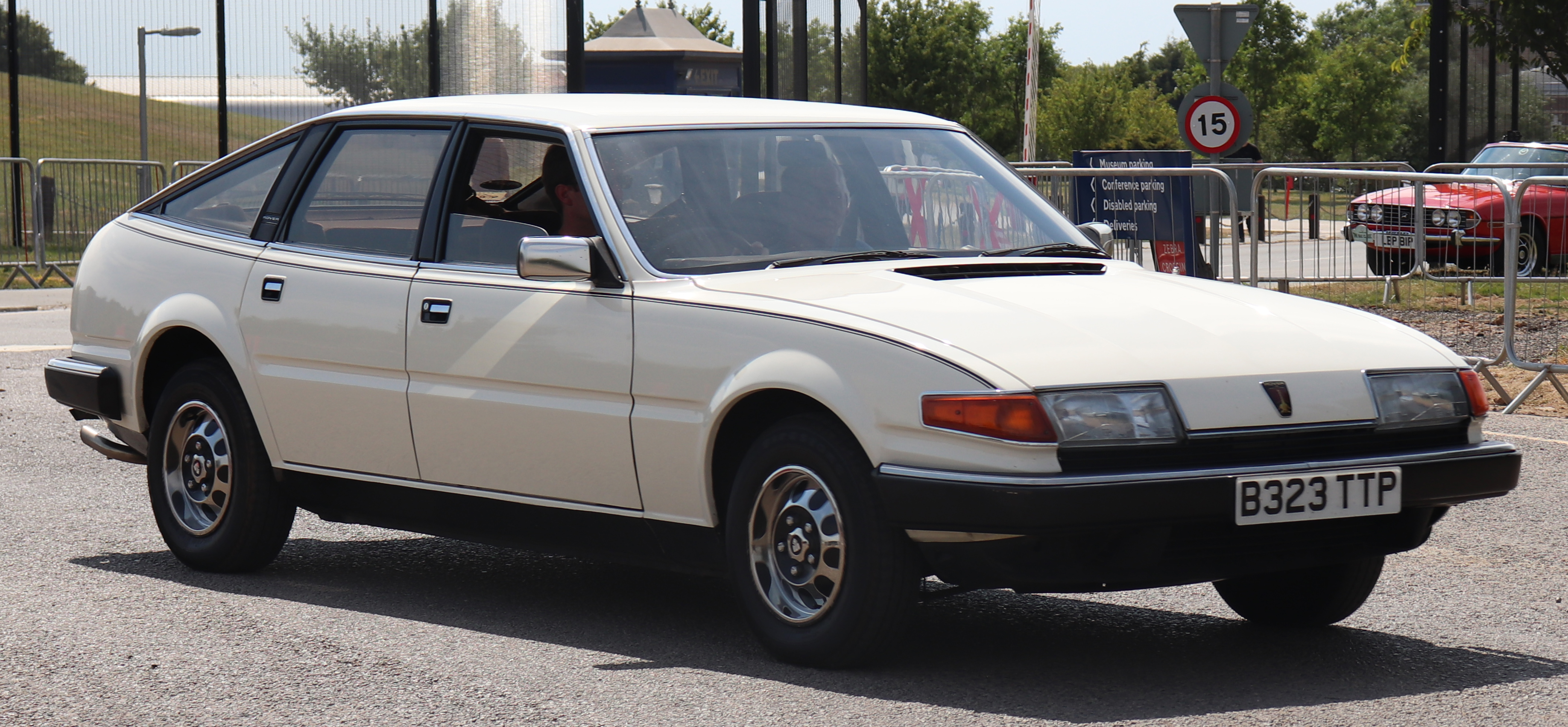
The Standard 2000 was a rebadged version of the Rover SD1 (pictured), manufactured by SMPIL

From 1985 to 1988 the company manufactured the Standard 2000, a version of the Rover SD1 powered by a 2 L (2,061 cc) Standard four-cylinder engine borrowed from an old Standard Vanguard model (as also used in the Standard 20 commercial vehicle). Power was a mere 83 hp (62 kW) at 4,250 rpm. With a kerb weight of 1,335 kg (2,940 lb) and a four-speed manual transmission (it, too, from the Standard 20), top speed was a lowly 145 km/h (90 mph). Standard had not been able to acquire a licence for the Rover SD1's more modern engines and thus had to rely on their existing technology. The 2000 featured higher ground clearance for the Indian market; but low quality, high price, and low performance combined to end the car after only about three years. Hopes had been high, with the Ministry of Industry claiming that the 2000 would be successful enough that the black market price of imported luxury cars would go down.

Production capacity was 4,000 per year, but this was never realised. Standard built only 11 cars in 1985 but 1,557 cars were finished in 1986.

The fuel efficiency claimed by the company which showed that it was in line with the then recently introduced fuel-efficiency standards were shown to be false. This led to a government inquiry and issues for the company. As a result, production ceased and the factory was closed. The disused factory sat dormant for years until the property was sold and the factory torn down. The majority of Rover SD1 parts were purchased in 2006 by Rimmer Brothers, a British classic vehicle parts company in the UK.

== Production ==
This table shows Standard's passenger car production. Some discrepancies are due to numbers being reported for the Indian financial year (1 April through 31 March), while occasionally numbers may signify a fifteen-month period (1 January through 31 March following year).

Year	1976	1977	1978	1979	1980	1981	1982	1983	1984	1985	1986	1987	1988	1989
Production	161	112	117	56	6	4	1	1	0	11	1,557; 2,221	995		5
Numbers in italics are for the Indian fiscal year (1 April–31 March)
