= LDV Group =

Former British van manufacturer

- Industry: Automotive
- Predecessor: Leyland DAF (DAF NV)
- Founded: April 1993; 33 years ago
- Defunct: October 2009; 16 years ago
- Successor: Maxus (SAIC Motor)
- Headquarters: Washwood Heath, Birmingham, England, UK
- Products: Vans
- Owner: GAZ (2006–2008)
- Number of employees: 850 (2009)
- Website: www.ldv.com

LDV Group Limited, formerly Leyland DAF Vans, was a British van manufacturer based in Washwood Heath, Birmingham. Historically part of Rover Group and Leyland DAF, it was later a wholly owned subsidiary of GAZ. Due to the 2008 financial crisis and a lack of long-term investment, production was suspended at the LDV factory in December 2008.

After a series of failed rescue attempts, the intellectual property rights were sold by administrators PricewaterhouseCoopers to Eco Concept in 2009, who sold them to SAIC Motor in 2010, with its Maxus subsidiary commencing production in China in March 2011.

== History ==
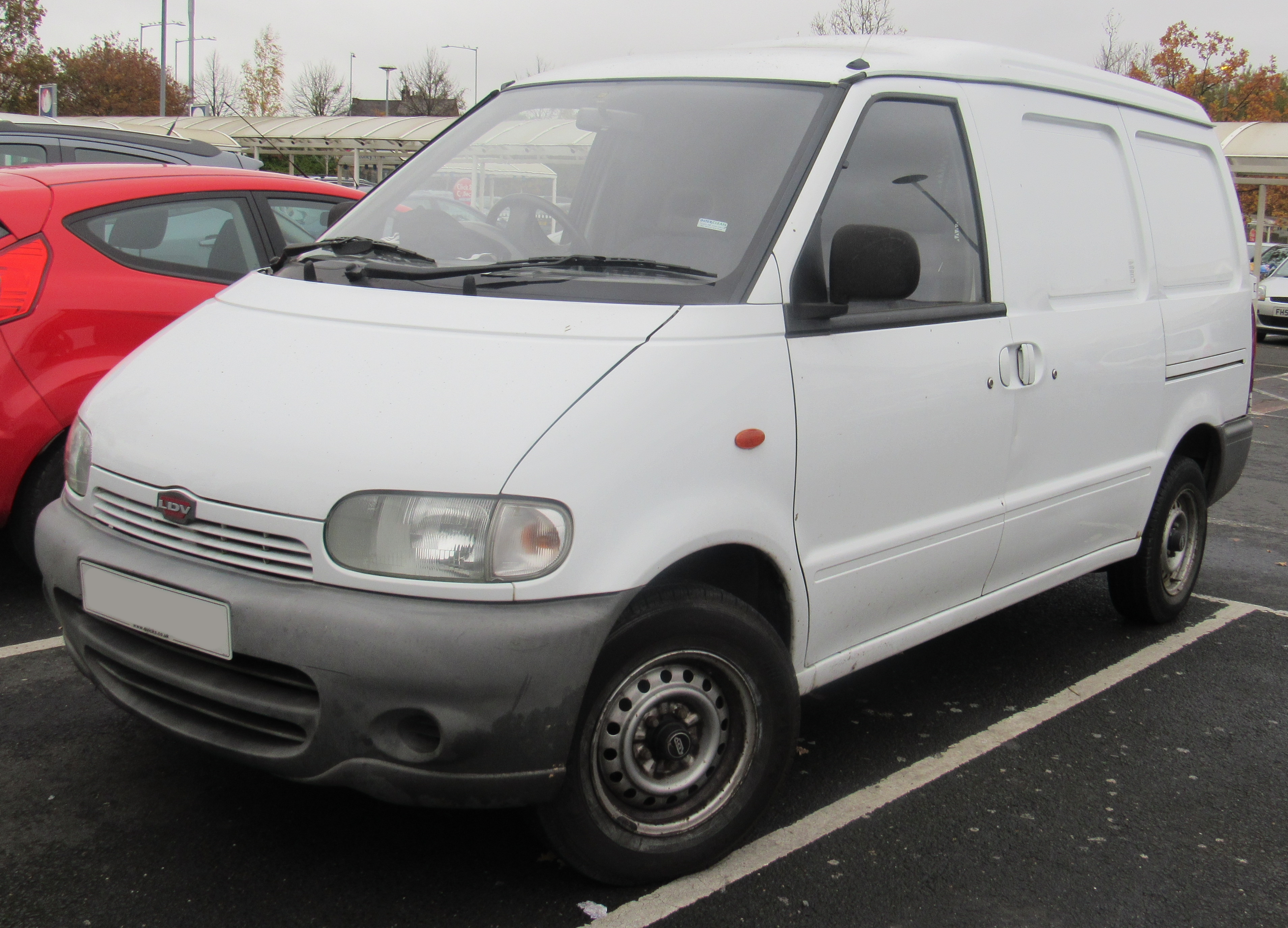
LDV Cub

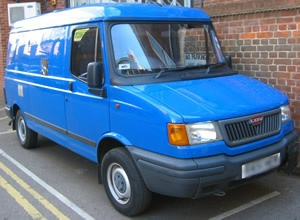
LDV Pilot

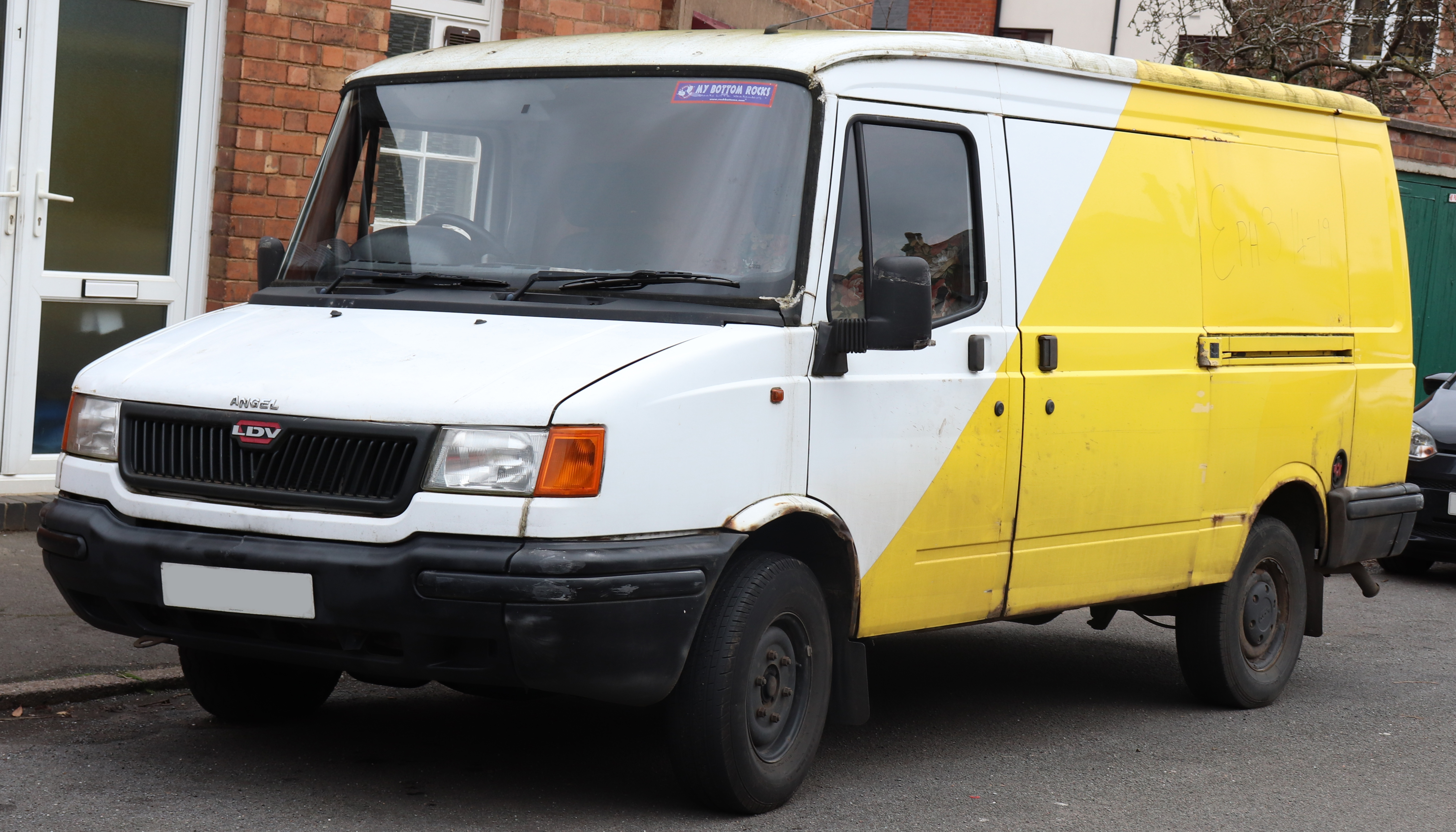
Low topped LDV Convoy

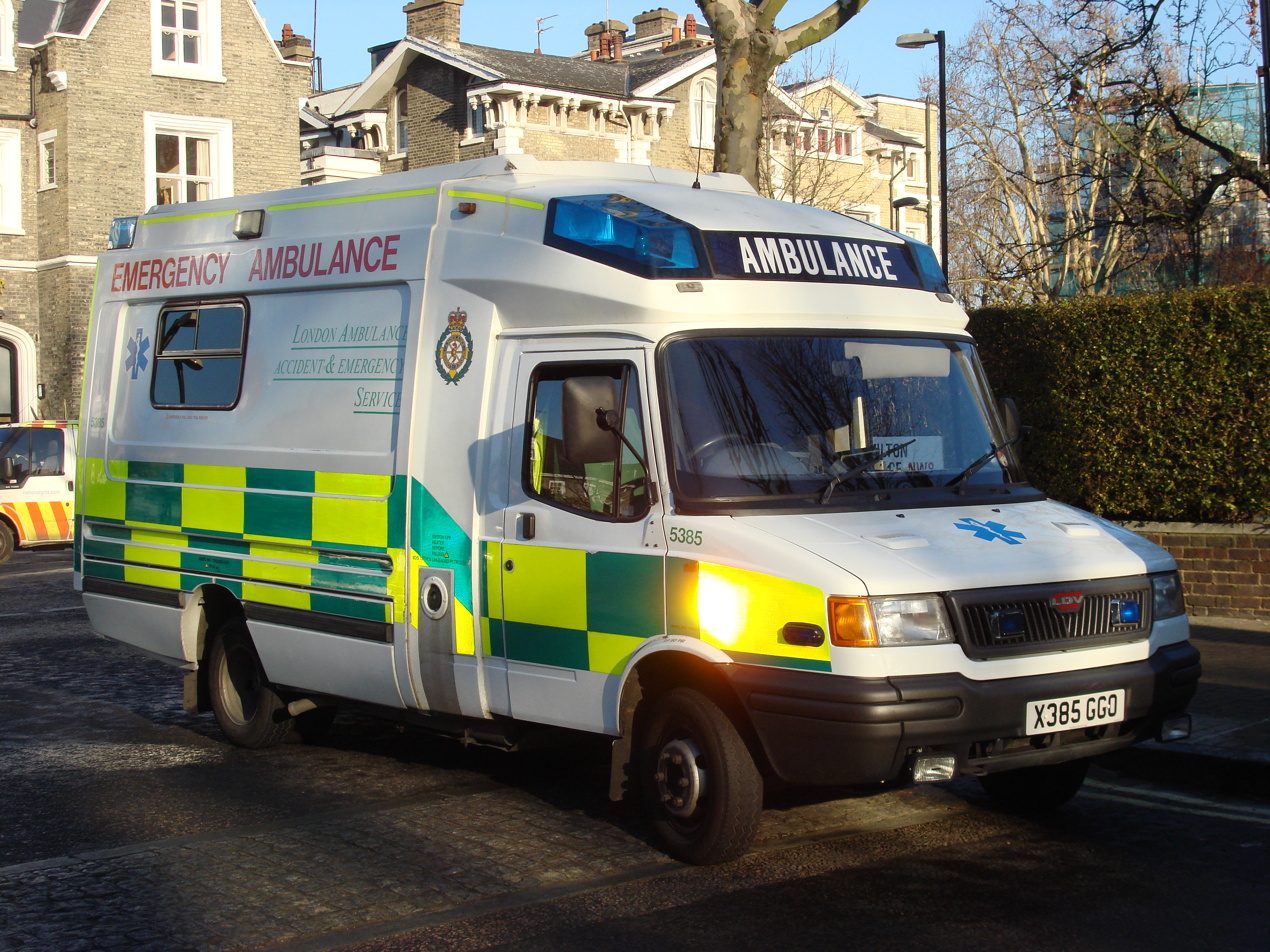
High topped LDV Convoy from 2000

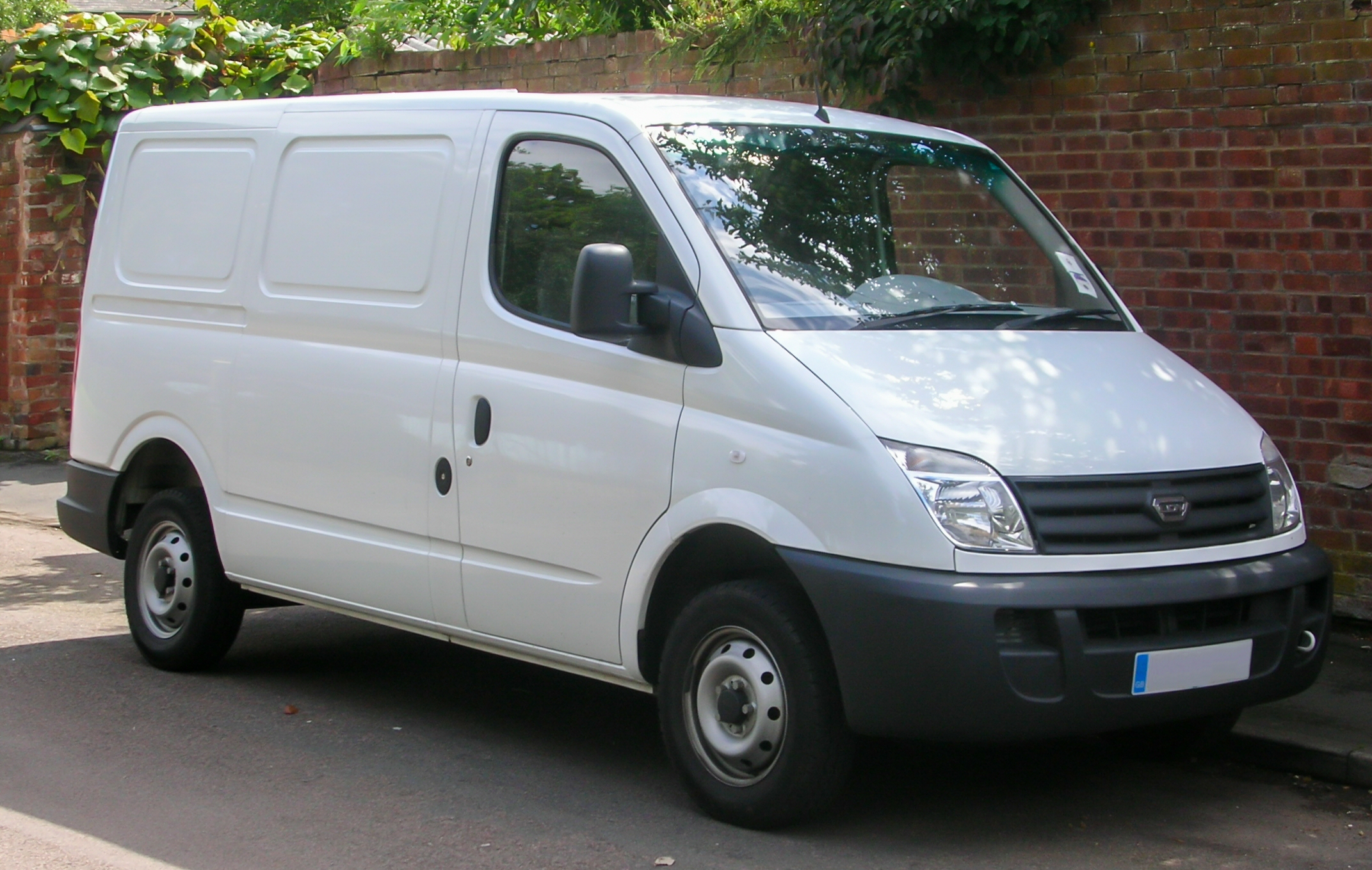
2005 LDV Maxus 2.8 CDi 95 SWB

LDV was formed in April 1993 as Leyland DAF Vans, following a management buyout backed by 3i of DAF NV's van plant in Washwood Heath, Birmingham, following the Dutch company being placed in administration. It was rebranded as LDV in January 1994.

Prior to its merger with Leyland Trucks and DAF Trucks to form DAF NV (which in the UK traded as Leyland DAF) in February 1987, it was part of the British Leyland/Rover Group empire, and was latterly the Freight Rover arm of the Land Rover Group division. For the most part of its history, LDV and its predecessors manufactured subsequent generations of the Leyland Sherpa from 1974, itself a re-engineered version of the Morris J4, which dated as far back as 1960 and manufactured by the British Motor Corporation - one of the two conglomerates that merged in 1968 to form British Leyland.

In December 2005, after going into administration, LDV was bought by group Sun Capital Partners, and was subject to a financial restructuring. What Van? reported LDV's commitment to its existing customers, including an assurance from their marketing director that their production target of 1,000 vans per month would put them well above break even point.

GAZ acquired LDV on 31 July 2006. Former Ford of Europe executive Martin Leach and former AT Kearney executive Steve Young were appointed to run the business and expand production at LDV's Birmingham plant by adding new product lines and entering new markets in Europe and elsewhere.

GAZ had plans to export LDV technology to Russia, and start producing the Maxus at its plant in Nizhny Novgorod (Russia), with 50,000 as an initial volume. There were also proposals to export the GAZ Maxus to Australia, a traditional market for British Leyland.

However, GAZ's plans never really showed any increased output, and due to the severe worldwide recession and a lack of long-term investment and commitment, production was suspended at the LDV factory in Birmingham in December 2008. After the British Government tried once again to save the company by agreeing to pour in £5 million of grants to enable Malaysia's WestStar Corporation to purchase LDV. WestStar failed to secure financing.

The intellectual property rights were sold by administrators PricewaterhouseCoopers to Chinese firm Eco Concept on 15 October 2009, who sold them to SAIC Motor in August 2010, with Maxus commencing production in China in March 2011.

Coincidentally, PWC were the same group of administrators who dealt with the demise of the MG Rover Group in 2005, the descendant of the original company Leyland Trucks was a part of. Also, SAIC Motor currently owns the rights to most of MG Rover's assets, reuniting the two companies.

== Vehicles ==
LDV produced a range of panel vans, pick ups and minibuses, all available with various modifications and specifications. LDV's main customers were large British corporations, such as Royal Mail, National Grid plc and many other utility companies, which were politically persuaded to buy British built vehicles.

200/400 Series The plant produced what was known as the 200 and 400 Series vans, inside the plant these were known as the K2 and 210 respectively. After the factory went into receivership in 1993, and a management backed buyout headed by Allan Amey, the 200 and 400 were given a facelift on the existing chassis, and renamed Pilot and Convoy.

=== Pilot/Convoy ===
Until 2006, LDV produced the Pilot and Convoy, derived from the British Leyland Sherpa, and developed considerably throughout the 1970s to 1990s, and which were a common sight in the United Kingdom.

=== Cub ===
Between 1998 and 2001, LDV sold the Cub, which is a rebranded version of the Nissan Vanette Cargo after LDV entered into an agreement with Nissan. Production stopped in 2001 when Nissan replaced the Vanette Cargo with a rebranded version of the Renault Trafic called the Nissan Primastar, which is produced in Luton, England and Barcelona, Spain. LDV, having struggled to sell the Cub, opted not to continue the agreement with Nissan.

=== Maxus ===
The last range of vans, the Maxus, was introduced in the end of 2004. The Maxus was originally planned as a joint venture with Daewoo Motors of South Korea. Daewoo however, went into receivership in November 2000, before the project came to fruition.

LDV subsequently acquired the exclusive rights to the van from General Motors, who had taken over Daewoo, and purchased the existing tooling and shipped it all to the Washwood Heath factory in Birmingham from the Daewoo Plant in Poland where the van was originally intended to be built. The Maxus was fitted with direct injection, common rail, diesel engines supplied by VM Motori.

== Sponsorships ==
LDV sponsored:

- Aston Villa Football Club from 1998 to 2000
- St Mirren Football Club from 2000 to 2003
- the EFL Trophy from 2000 to 2006
