= Leyland OE engine =

Diesel engine

The Leyland OE engine (OE.138/OE.160) is a diesel, pushrod (OHV) straight-four engine based on the Standard 23C design and redesigned by Leyland Motors subsequent to their 1961 takeover of Standard-Triumph. Intended for light trucks and commercials, tractors, and industrial usage, the engine was available in either high speed and low speed designs, in two different displacements. The name means "Oil Engine", followed by the displacement in cubic inches. It was built from 1961 until the late 1960s.

== Technical detail ==
The engine was very similar to the Standard 23C engine, keeping that engine's OHV, replaceable cylinder liner design. The Leyland redesign kept the Standard 23C's bore and stroke of 3.3125 in × 4 in (84.1 mm × 101.6 mm), giving a 2.3 L (2,260 cc; 137.9 cu in) capacity. Standard had earlier updated the 23C with glow plugs in each cylinder head; this was retained for the OE.138, as was the Ricardo pre-combustion (indirect injection) design. In 1964, the larger OE.160 was introduced - bore and stroke were increased to 3.455 in × 4.25 in (87.8 mm × 108.0 mm), for a 2.6 L (2,611 cc; 159.3 cu in) dsiplacement. The OE.160's bigger bore and stroke were made possible by using thinner, press-fit cylinder liners and a longer-throw crankshaft.

Power outputs (net figures) were 54 hp (40 kW) at 3,000 rpm for the OE.138 as installed in the Leyland 2-tonner truck (later known as the Leyland 90) when it was introduced in 1962. The larger OE.160 arrived in September 1964; the maximum power in the High Speed version is 60 hp (45 kW) at the same engine speed. The gross output for the smaller OE.138 was 60 horsepower as well. Net torque figures are 105 lb⋅ft (142 N⋅m) at 1,750 rpm for the OE.138, 123 lb⋅ft (167 N⋅m) at 1,700 rpm for the OE.160. The Low Speed engines, designed for continuous power supply, produced 36 and 40 hp (27 and 30 kW) respectively.

The smaller version was also installed on the Standard Atlas (later known as the Leyland 15/20) light van.
