= Standard Atlas =

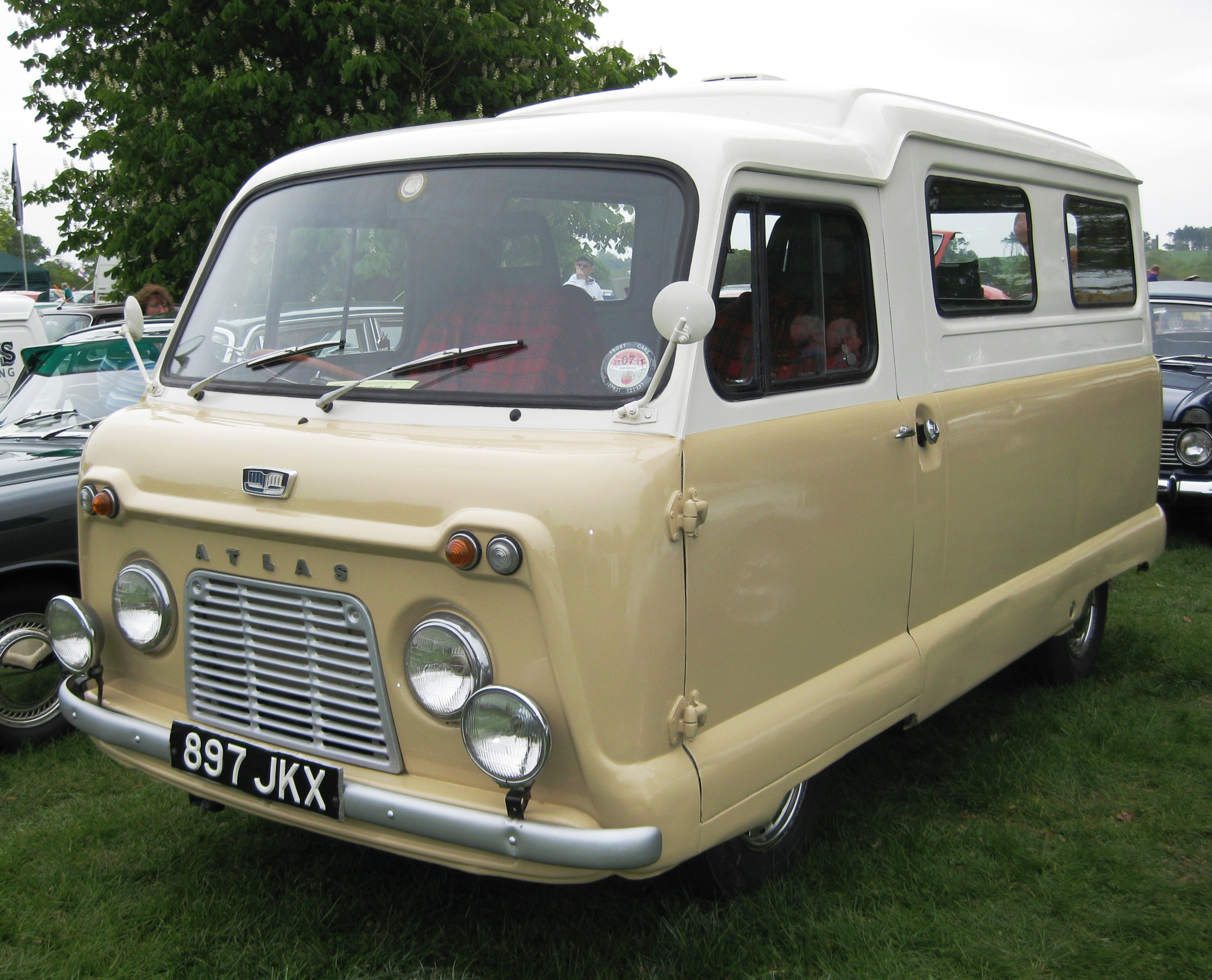
- Standard Atlas Major

Overview
- Manufacturer: Standard Motor Company; Leyland Motors Limited; British Leyland Motor Corporation Limited (BLMC); Standard Motors India
- Also called: Standard Atlas Major; Standard 15/20; Leyland 15/20; Triumph Atlas
- Production: 1958–1980
- Assembly: United Kingdom; India: Chennai

Body and chassis
- Class: Light van
- Related: Standard Pennant; Standard Vanguard Utility

Chronology
- Predecessor: Standard Vanguard Utility
- Successor: Morris 250 JU

The Standard Atlas is a light van which was produced and sold under various names between 1958 and 1980, initially in Britain and Europe, and subsequently in India.

== Standard Atlas, Standard Atlas Major and Standard 15/20 (1958–1968) ==
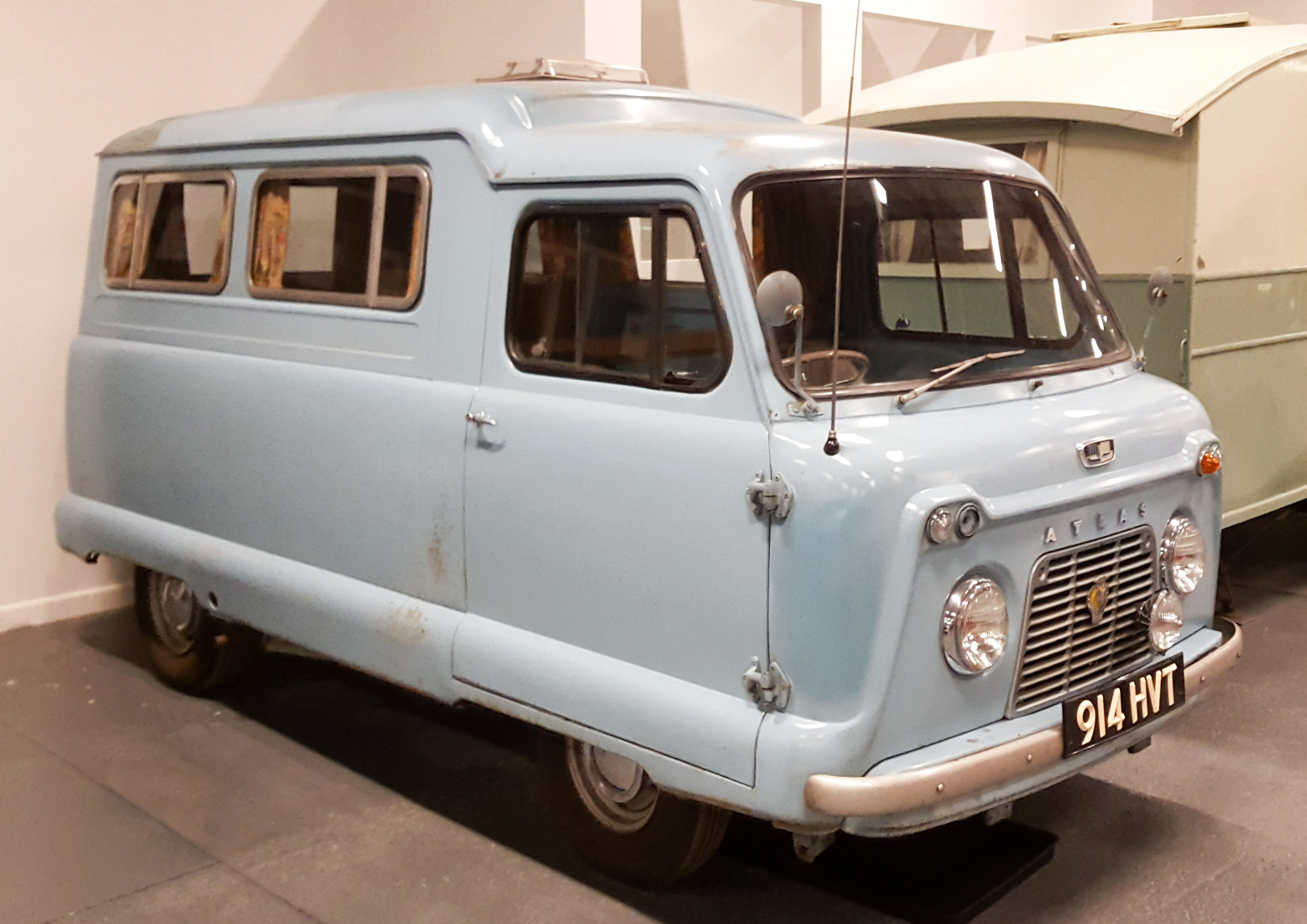
Standard Atlas Camper Van 1959

In 1958 Standard presented the Atlas, their contender in the growing but (in Britain) increasingly crowded small van sector. It was a competitor for BMCs venerable J-Type and the much more modern Morris J2, as well as for the Ford Thames 400E, Commer FC and the market leading Bedford CA. For some export markets, notably Canada and the U.S. the Standard Atlas was badged as a Triumph, reflecting the value of the brand recognition achieved for the Triumph by their sedans and sports models.

Light vans in Britain at the time were commonly identified by their maximum permissible gross payload, and the Atlas was frequently marketed as the Atlas 10 cwt or Atlas 12 cwt, corresponding to allowable load weights (including the driver) of 510 or 610 kg, respectively. In addition to the panel van, a pickup truck variant was available. Customers could choose between hinged or sliding doors, as well as an optional central side door. A small flatbed truck version was also produced, which featured rear hinged doors.

Like its competitors, the Atlas shared its engine with a passenger car from its manufacturer's range. In this case the engine in question was firstly the 948 cc (57.9 cu in) petrol engine from the Standard Ten, which was installed under a cowling between the driver and passenger, and delivered power to the rear wheels, although certain parts came from the Standard Vanguard Utility. In this form the van was very slow. That was addressed in 1961 when it became possible to specify the van with a 1,670 cc (102 cu in) petrol. The larger dimensions of this engine meant that the chassis had to be enlarged and the cabin design rearranged. At the same time the smaller engine was enlarged to 1,147 cc (70.0 cu in).

Around 1960 new versions with payload limits raised to 15 cwt (760 kg gross) and 20 cwt (1,020 kg gross) were introduced. These heavier-duty models were provided with the Standard 2,138 cc (130.5 cu in) petrol engine that also powered the Triumph TR4. It was also possible to order the 15/20 cwt vans with a diesel engine. The unit in question was a 2,260 cc (138 cu in) 60 hp (45 kW) Leyland OE.138 unit of Massey Ferguson origins; this was also installed in tractors and industrial machinery. Freeman Sanders had developed the diesel engine and it was manufactured by Standard Motors.

After the Standard Company was merged into Leyland Motors in 1961, the Atlas vans' badging was changed to Leyland 15 and Leyland 20 in 1962.

== Leyland 15/20 (1962–1968) ==
In 1963 Standard was acquired by Leyland Motors Limited and for 1964, the van was renamed Leyland 15 / Leyland 20 (according to capacity).

In 1968, Leyland merged with the British Motor Corporation to form the British Leyland Motor Corporation, and the van was taken out of production in order to avoid direct competition with a range of vans such as the Morris JU 250, now produced by the same company.

== Standard 15/20 in India (1970–1980) ==
After production of the van in the United Kingdom had ended, the tooling and panel presses were exported to southern India where the van re-emerged, to be produced, between 1970 and 1980 by Standard Motors of Chennai.
