= Morris 250 JU =

Austin/Morris 250 JU Van
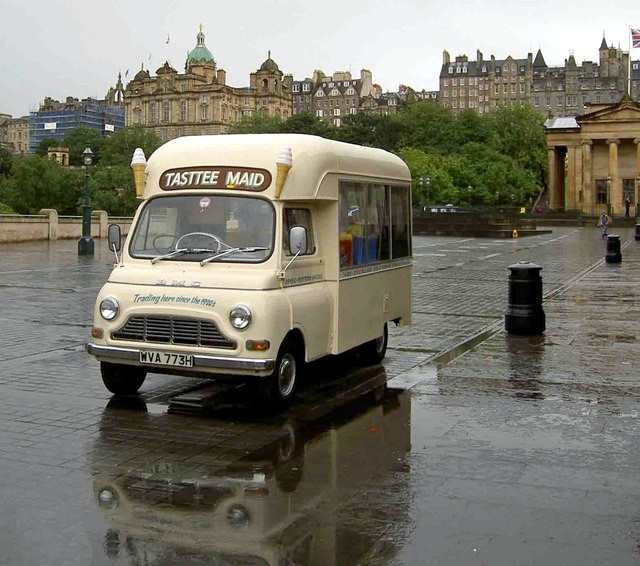
- 250 JU ice cream van

Overview
- Manufacturer: Morris Commercial
- Production: 1967–1974

Body and chassis
- Class: Van

Powertrain
- Transmission: 4-speed manual

Chronology
- Predecessor: Morris Commercial J2; Standard Atlas
- Successor: Leyland Sherpa

The Morris 250 JU (also available, initially, badged as the Austin 250 JU) is a forward control (driver's cab on top of the engine) light van launched by Morris Commercial in October 1967. It was offered with the familiar B series petrol engine in 1,622 cc (99.0 cu in) form. Claimed power output was 49 bhp, with a compression ratio of 7.2:1.

The van was rated on a gross-weight basis rather than on the more familiar (for UK buyers at the time) load carrying capability. The number '250' in its name was intended to indicate a gross loaded weight of 2½ long (British) tons, implying a substantial carrying capacity of 22 long hundredweight (1.1 long tons).

When road tested by Britain's Autocar magazine, a 250 JU vehicle converted into a 4,180 lb (1.90 t) motor home achieved a maximum speed of 58 mph (93 km/h). The testers thought the van a big improvement over the J2 which it replaced, but found it remained "clumsy to drive" with the "need for constant expertise to overcome its faults". Engine noise, especially above 40 mph (64 km/h) was a particular source of criticism.

Following the formation of the British Leyland Motor Corporation in 1968, into which BMC, by then a subsidiary of British Motor Holdings, had been absorbed, the van was branded as the BMC 250 JU. It was then rebadged again in 1970 as the 'Austin Morris 250 JU', finally ending production with the introduction of the Leyland Sherpa, with which it shared some components, in 1974.

In addition to the standard panel vans, 250 JU chassis were also made available to specialist manufacturers for conversion into motor homes.

Neither the development nor the marketing of the van appears to have been prioritized by its manufacturers. It was outsold even in its home market by competitor vehicles such as the front-engined Ford Transit.
