= Standard Ten =

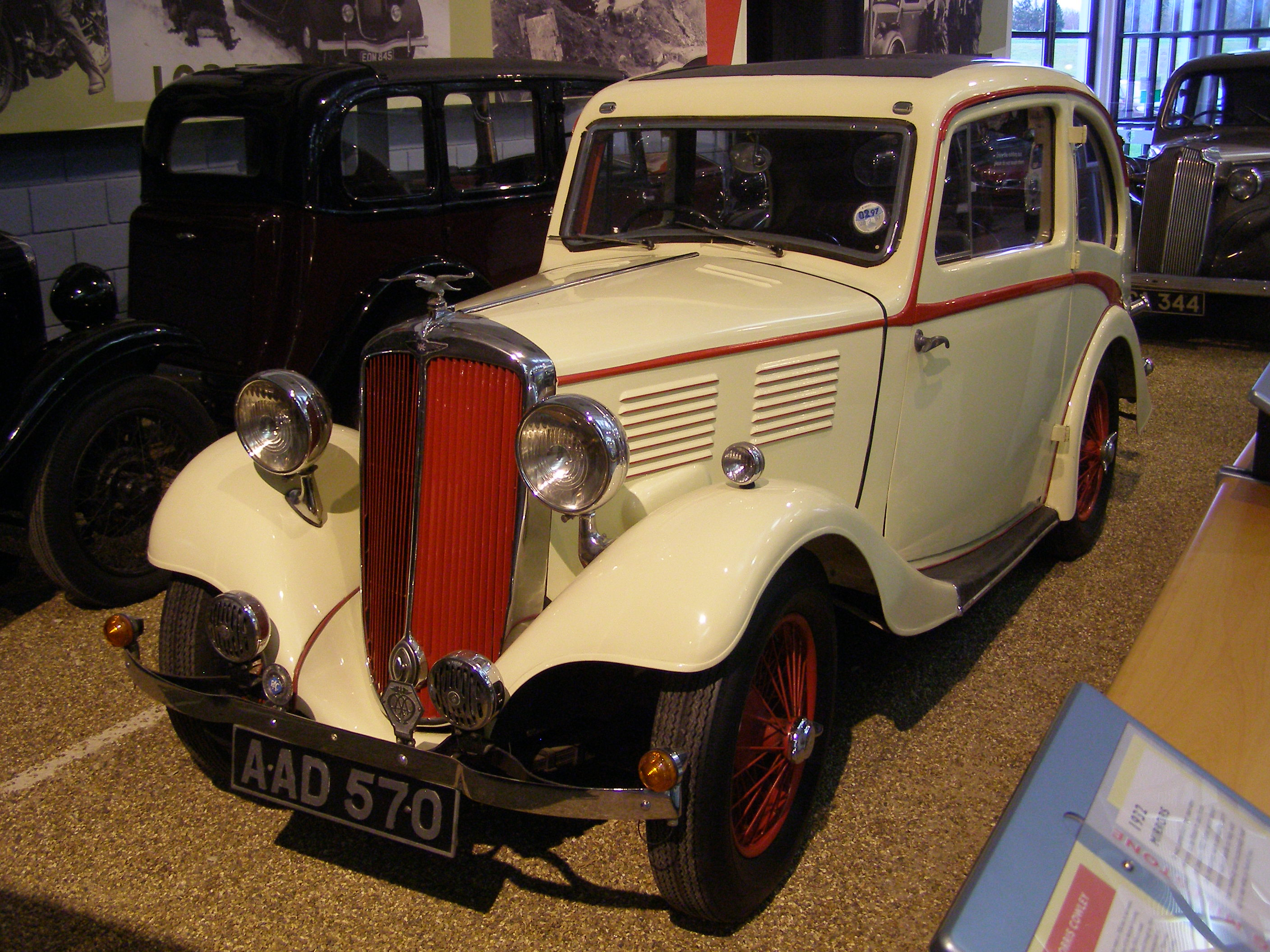
A 1934 Standard 10/12 Speedline

The Standard Ten was a model name given to several small cars produced by the British Standard Motor Company between 1906 and 1961. The name was a reference to the car's fiscal horsepower or tax horsepower, a function of the surface area of the pistons. This system quickly became obsolete as an estimate of the power produced by the engine, but it continued to be relevant as a way to classify cars for tax purposes. Like other manufacturers, Standard continued to use the name to define the approximate size of their 'Ten' model long after the origins of the name had, in Britain, become inapplicable.

An experimental two-cylinder "10" was made in 1906, after which Standard's next car in that category was a four-cylinder 9.5 tax horsepower built between 1914 and 1919. They returned to the 10 tax horsepower market in 1934; this model was replaced in 1937 by a "Flying Ten" that lasted until the outbreak of World War II.

Standard again returned to the 10 tax horsepower market in 1954 with another Ten, which was supplemented in 1957 by an up-market version called the Pennant. The Ten and the Pennant were replaced by the Triumph Herald in 1961.

== Edwardian 10 hp cars ==
Standard 9.5 hp

Overview
- Manufacturer: Standard Motor Company
- Production: 1914–1915, 1919

Body and chassis
- Layout: FR

Powertrain
- Engine: inline four side-valve engine 1914–1915: 1087 cc 1919: 1328 cc

Dimensions
- Wheelbase: 1914–1915: 2,286 mm (90 in); 1919: 2,336.8 mm (92 in)
- Length: 1914–1915: 3,200 mm (126 in); 1919: 3,277 mm (129 in)

Chronology
- Successor: 1934 Standard 10 hp

The name was first used in 1906 on an experimental two-cylinder 10 tax horsepower car. The side-valve engine had a 70 mm bore and an 82 mm stroke, giving a capacity of 631 cc.

A 9.5 tax horsepower four-cylinder car was introduced in 1914 and built until 1915. A version of this car, with increases in wheelbase and engine stroke, was offered in 1919.

== 10 hp (1934–1936) ==
Standard 10 hp
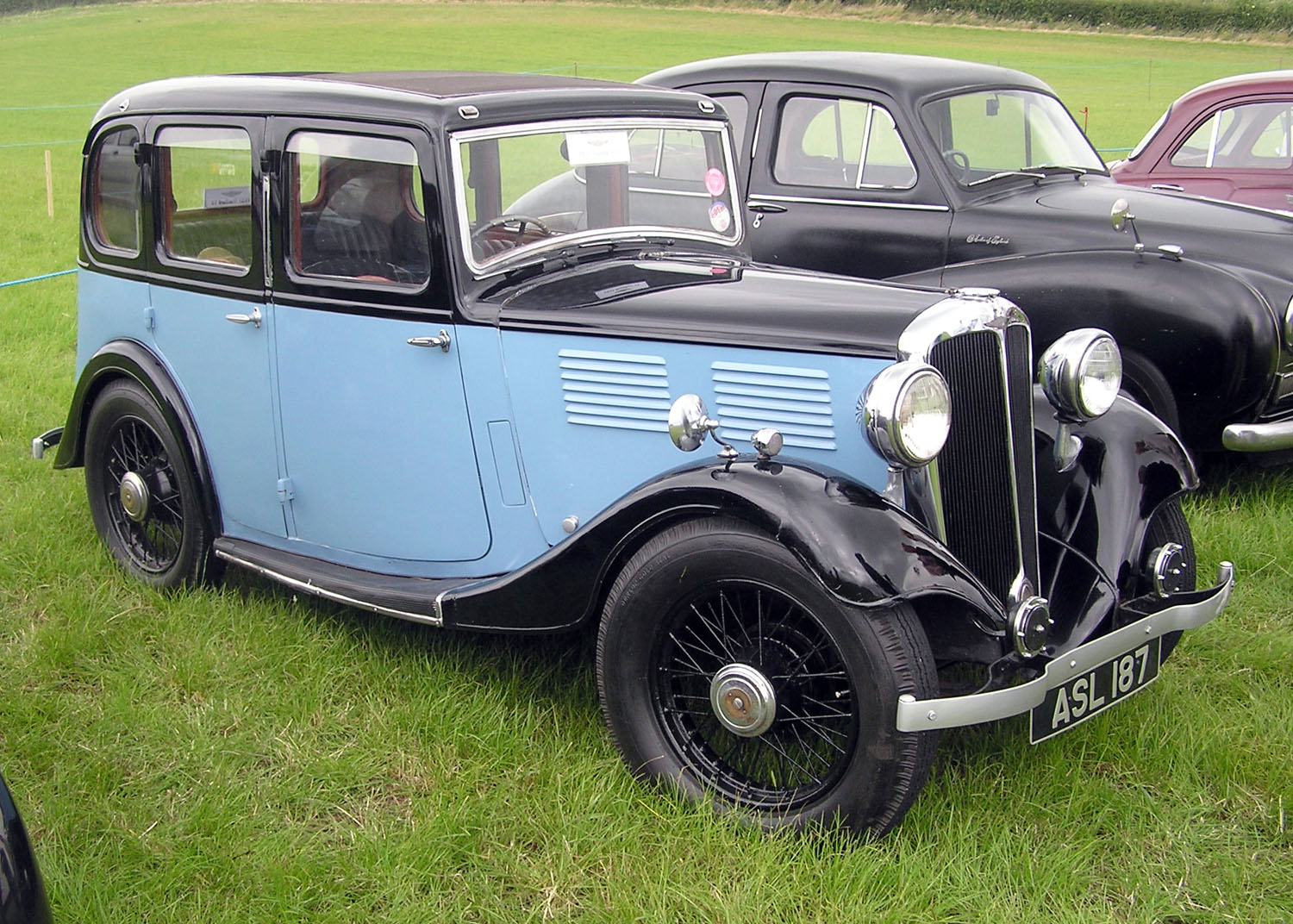

Overview
- Manufacturer: Standard Motor Company
- Production: 1934–1936

Body and chassis
- Layout: FR

Powertrain
- Engine: 1343 cc inline four side-valve engine

Dimensions
- Wheelbase: base: 2,311 mm (91 in) optional: 2,388 mm (94 in)

Chronology
- Predecessor: 1919 Standard 9.5 hp
- Successor: 1934 Standard 10 hp

== Flying Ten ==
Standard Flying Ten
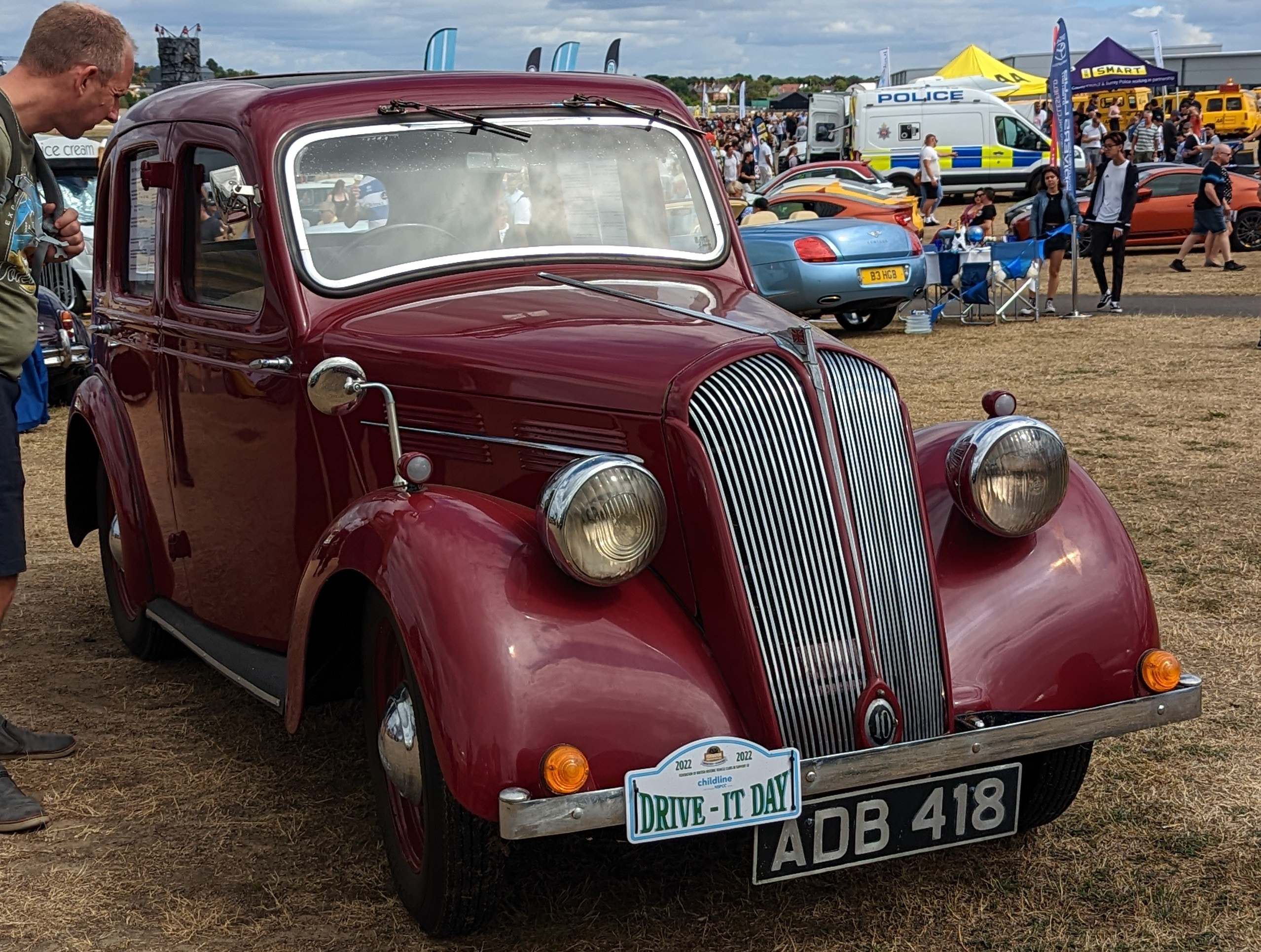
- 1938 Standard Flying 10 (10BL)

Overview
- Production: 1937–1939

Body and chassis
- Body style: saloon 2 door coupe utility

Powertrain
- Engine: 1267 cc Inline-four engine
- Transmission: Three speed manual

Dimensions
- Wheelbase: 90 in (2,286 mm)
- Length: 152 in (3,861 mm)
- Width: 56.5 in (1,435 mm)

The Flying Ten was a replacement for the earlier Ten with the semi-streamlined look of the Standard Flying range. The side-valve 1267 cc long stroke (100 mm) engine had a single Zenith carburettor and could produce 33 bhp (25 kW) at 4000 rpm. Drive was to the rear wheels through a 3-speed synchromesh gearbox. The suspension was conventional at first with a solid front axle but this was upgraded to an independent set-up at the front with a transverse leaf spring in 1939. A top speed of around 65 mph (105 km/h) was attainable. Brakes were cable operated using the Bendix system. In early 1941, 150 four-doors were built for the military after civilian production had ceased.

A sportier version, the Light Flying Ten was also made.

== Post-war models ==
Standard Ten
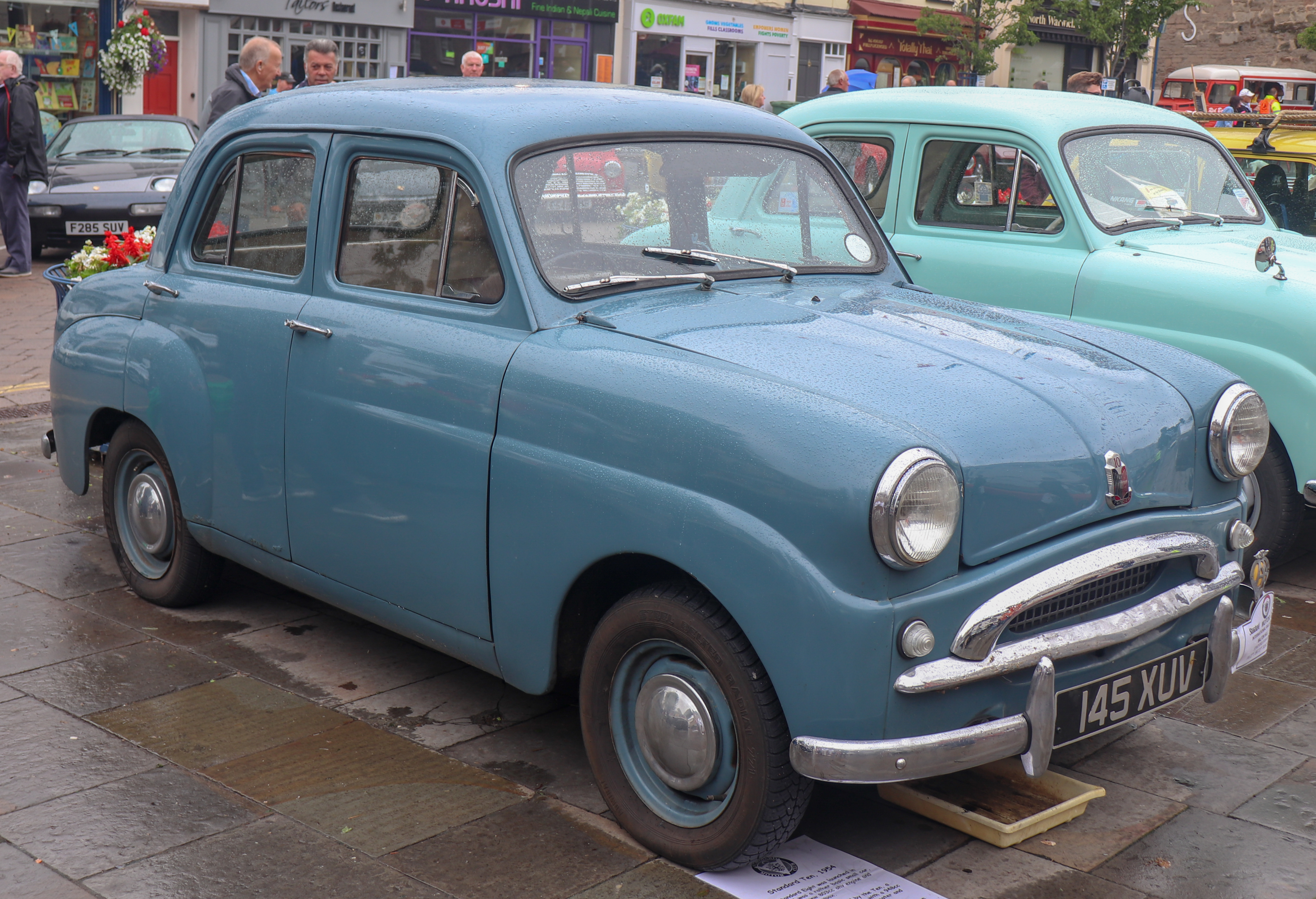
- 1954 Standard Ten Saloon

Overview
- Also called: Standard Companion (estate); Standard 6 cwt (van & pickup); Standard Cadet (Australia); Standard Vanguard Junior (Sweden); Triumph 10/TR-10 (North America)
- Production: May 1954–1960; 172,500 made
- Assembly: United Kingdom; Australia; India

Body and chassis
- Body style: 4-door saloon 4-door estate car 2-door coupe utility 2-door panel van

Powertrain
- Engine: 948 cc OHV I4
- Transmission: Four speed manual optional overdrive

Dimensions
- Wheelbase: 84 in (2,134 mm)
- Length: 144 in (3,658 mm)
- Width: 60 in (1,524 mm)
- Height: 60 in (1,524 mm)

In 1954 the Ten was introduced as a more powerful, better-appointed version of the Standard Eight, with the Eight's Standard SC engine increased in size to 948 cc and sharing a similar frame and transmission. Overdrive (from March 1957) or a temperamental semi-automatic were available as options.

An estate (station wagon) version, the Companion, was launched in June 1955. It was among the first small British estate cars to have rear-passenger doors (like the saloon, and unlike its rivals such as the Ford Squire and Hillman Husky which used the two-door "van" arrangement).

A small number of left-hand-drive Tens were exported to the US and sold as the Triumph TR-10. On these, the two-tone colour arrangement normally reserved for the Pennant was available (though this export model was not tailfinned).

A Ten saloon tested by the British magazine The Motor in 1954 had a top speed of 69.0 mph (111.0 km/h) and could accelerate from 0-60 mph (97 km/h) in 38.3 seconds. A fuel consumption of 34.4 miles per imperial gallon (8.2 L/100 km; 28.6 mpg_{‑US}) was recorded. The test car cost £580 including taxes.

In 1955, supported by an inscrutable handicapping régime favouring small cars, a factory-prepared Standard Ten, driven by Jimmy Ray and Brian Horrocks, won the UK's RAC Rally.

For the United States export market the car was badged as the Triumph 10 and in Scandinavia it was sold as the Standard Vanguard Junior. In Australia the Ten was known as the Cadet.

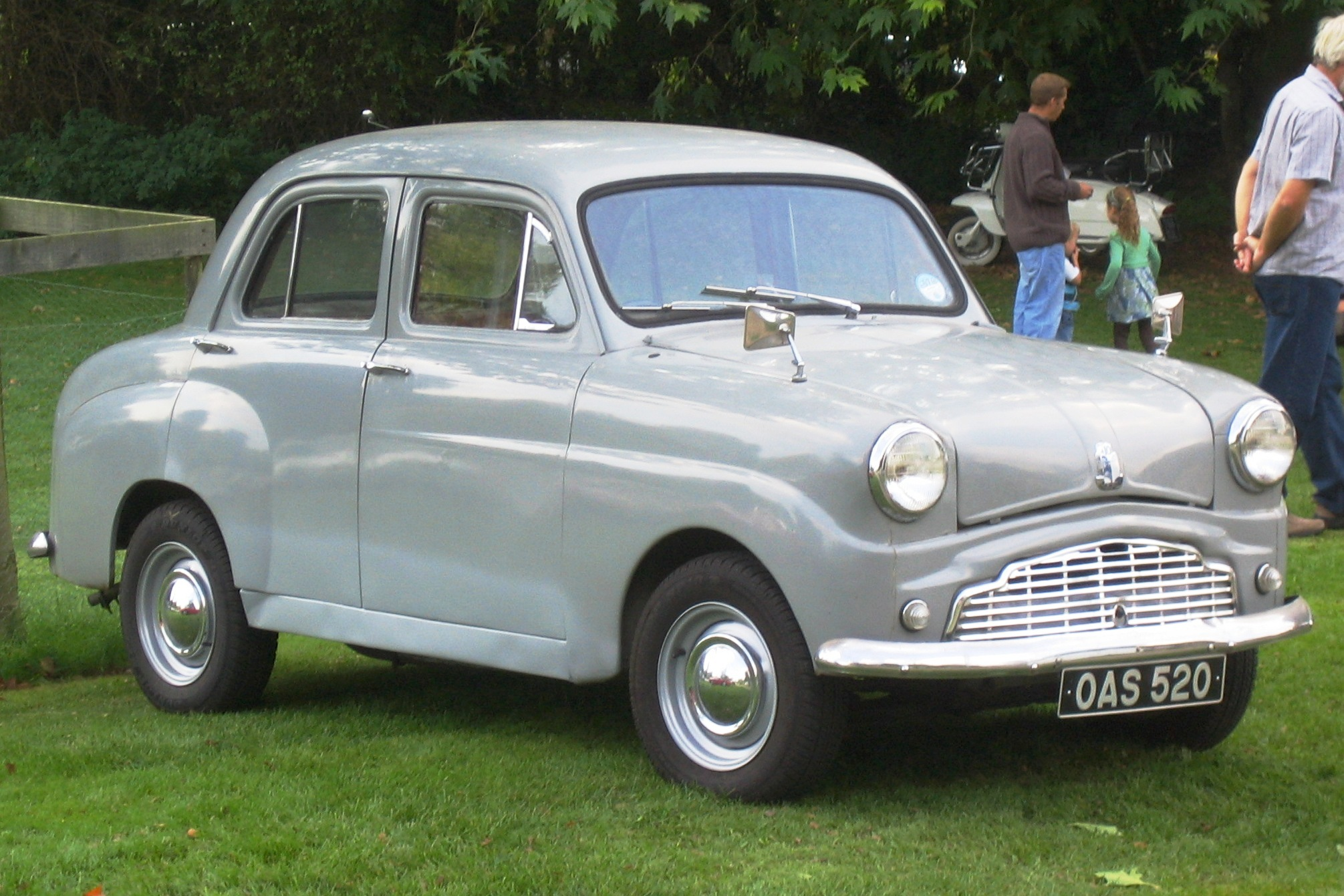
1959 Standard Ten (facelifted model)

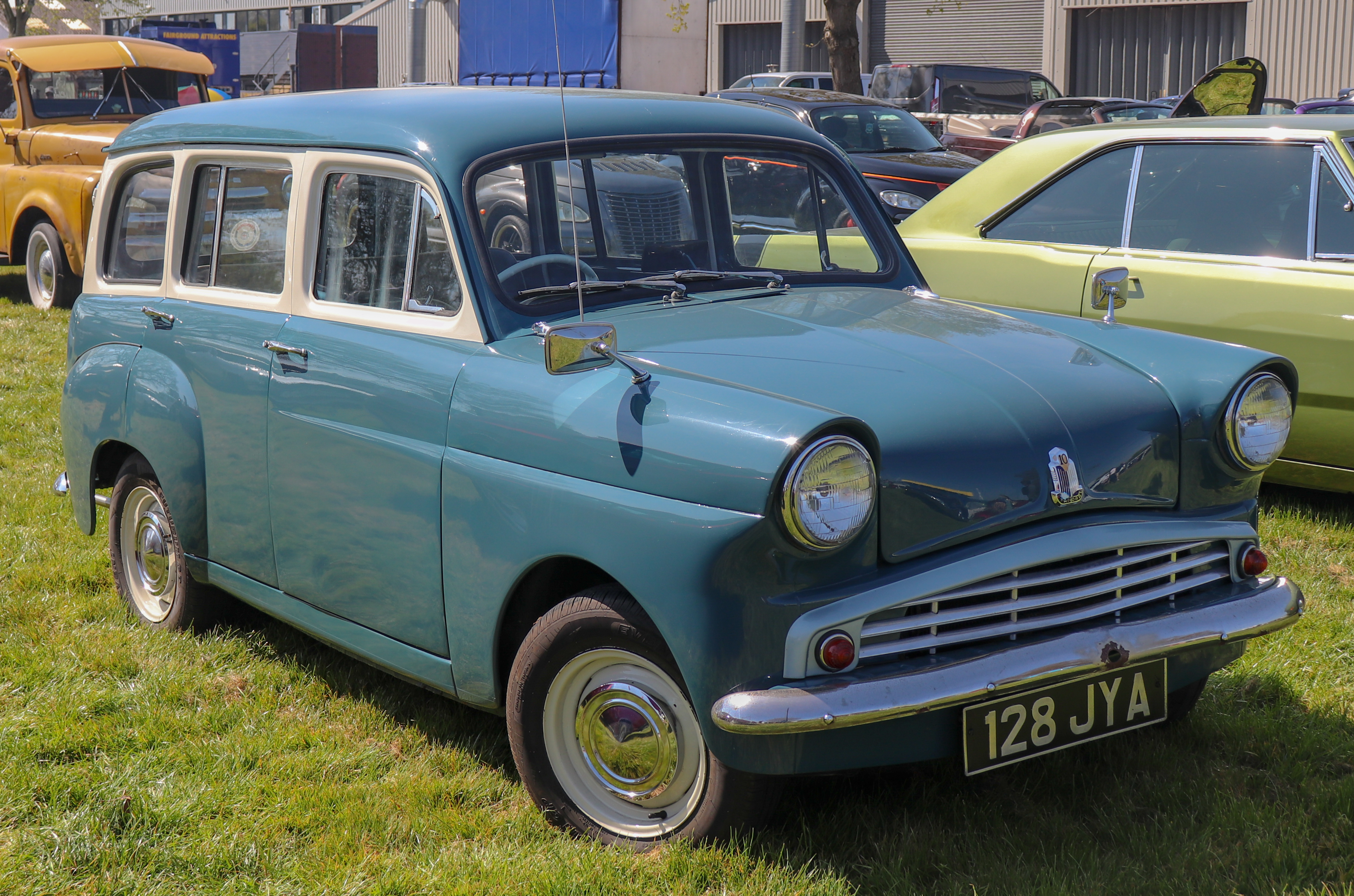
Standard Companion estate car

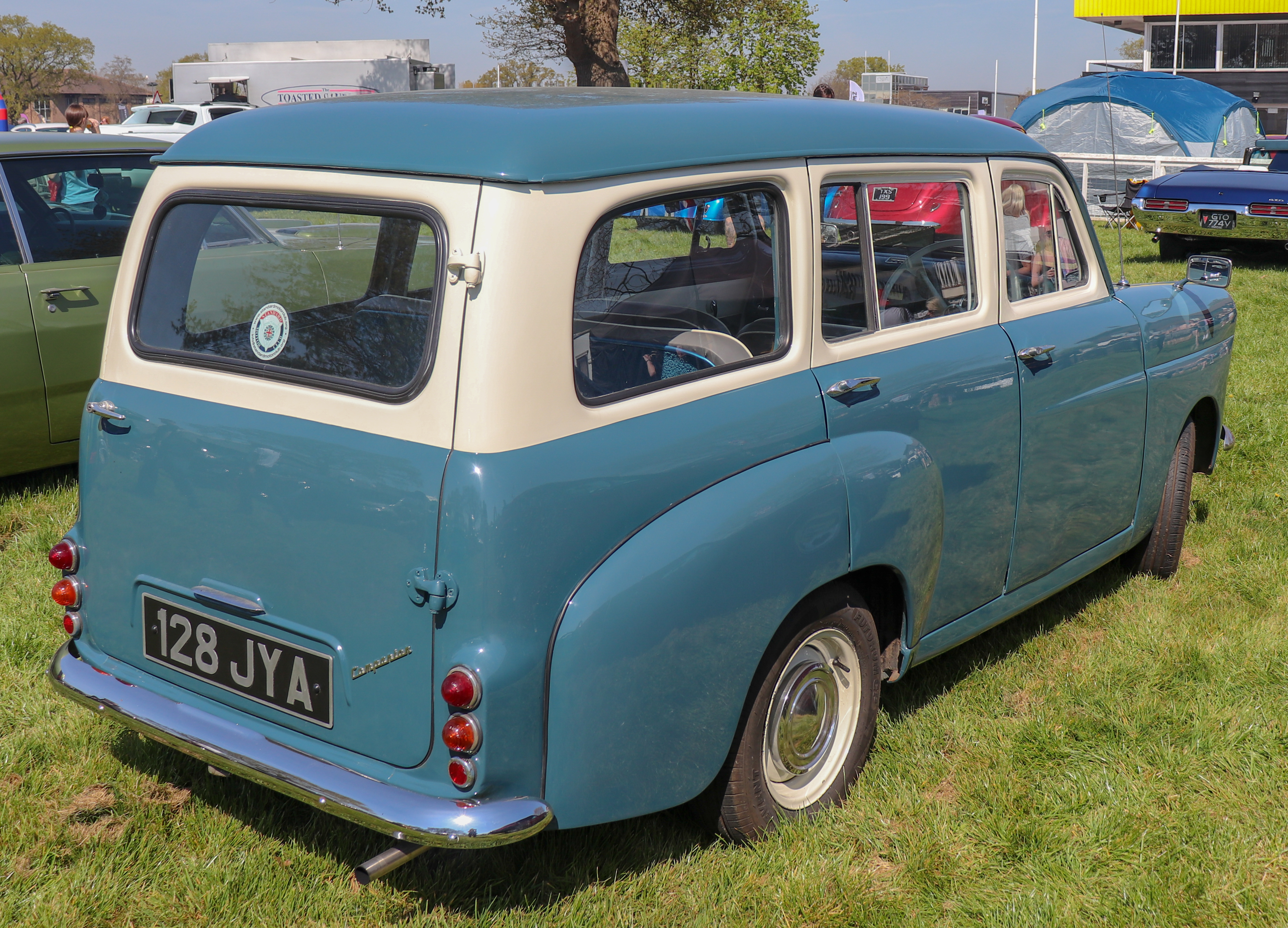
Standard Companion estate car

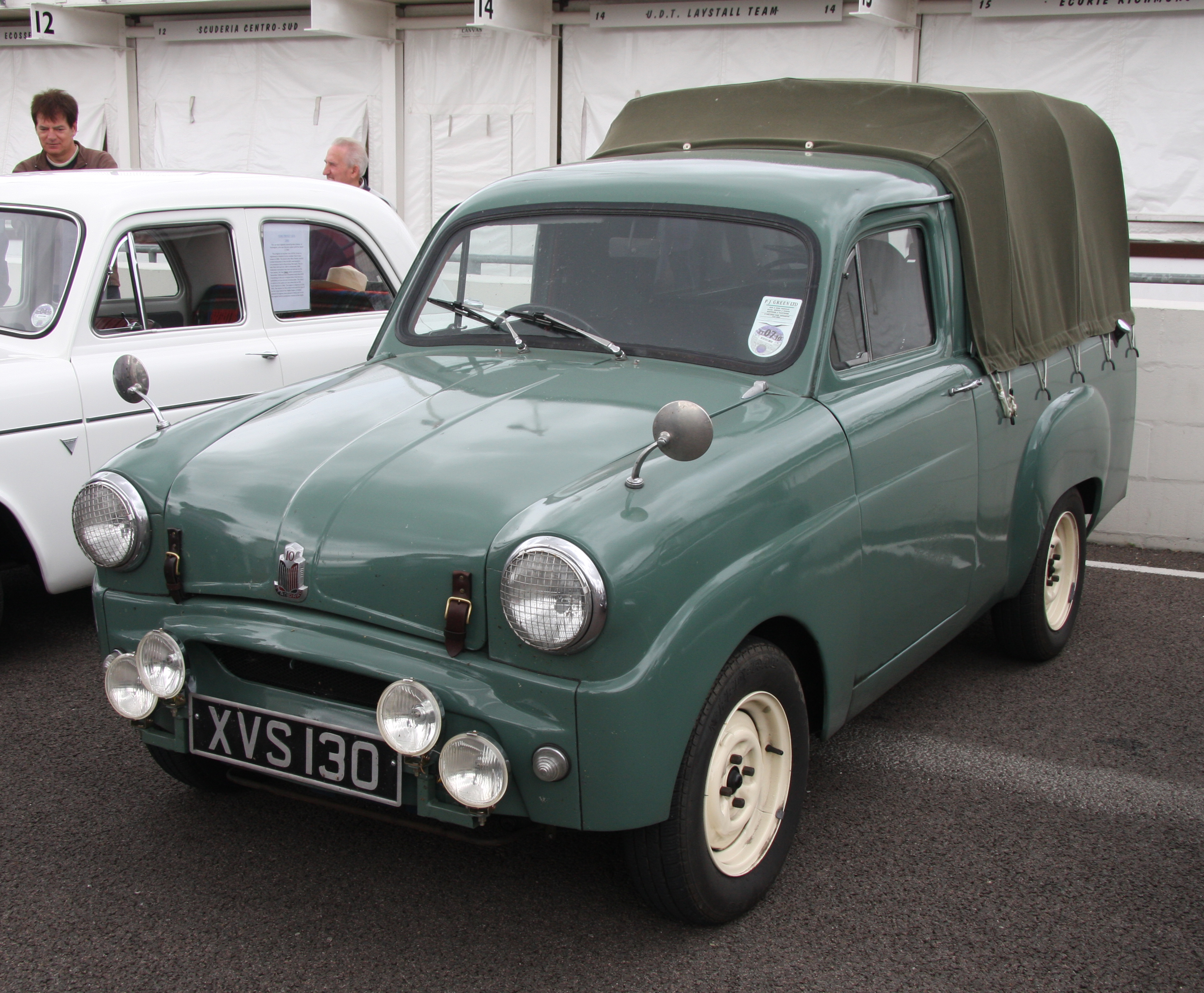
Standard 6 cwt pickup

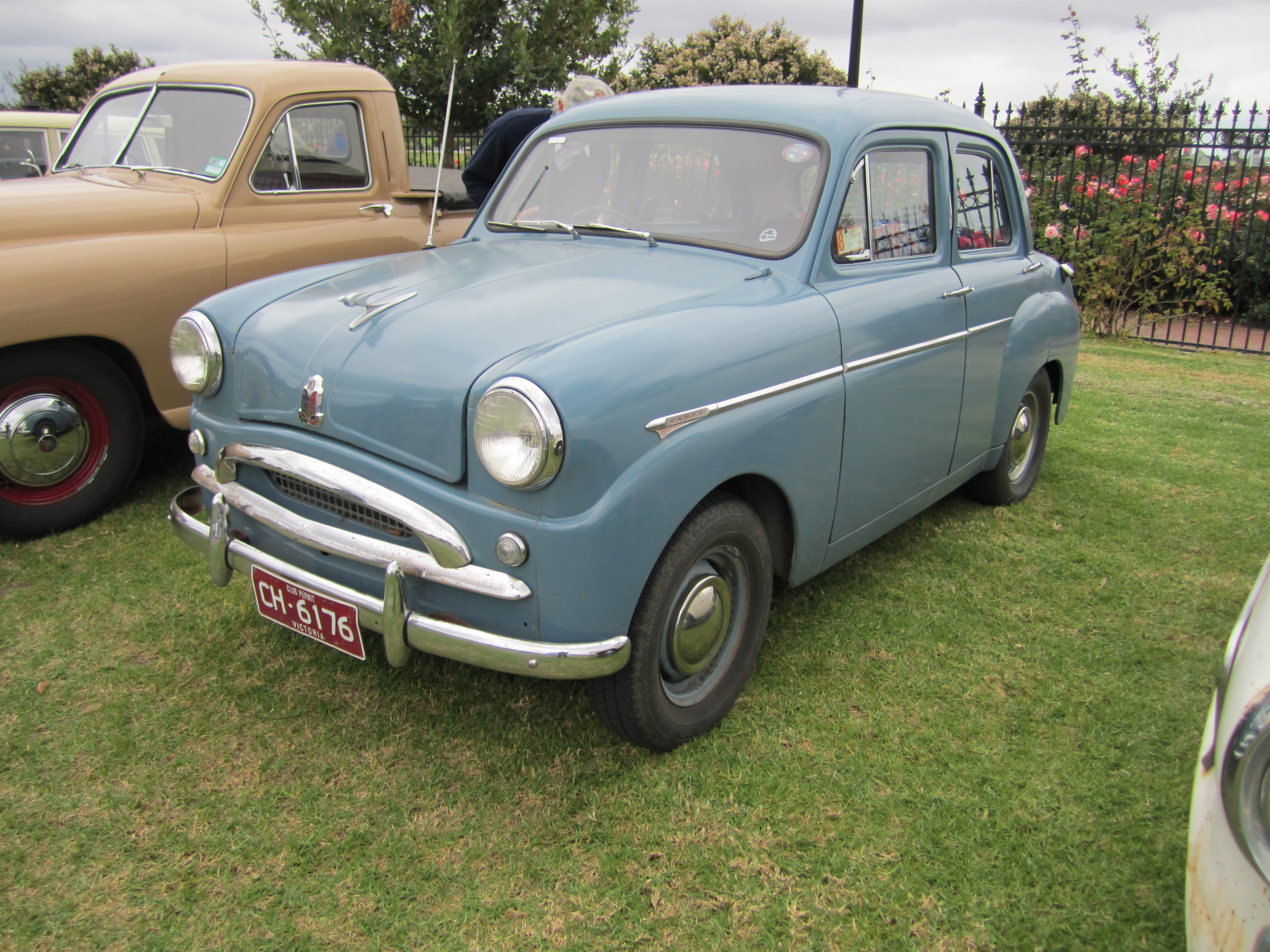
Australian market Standard Cadet

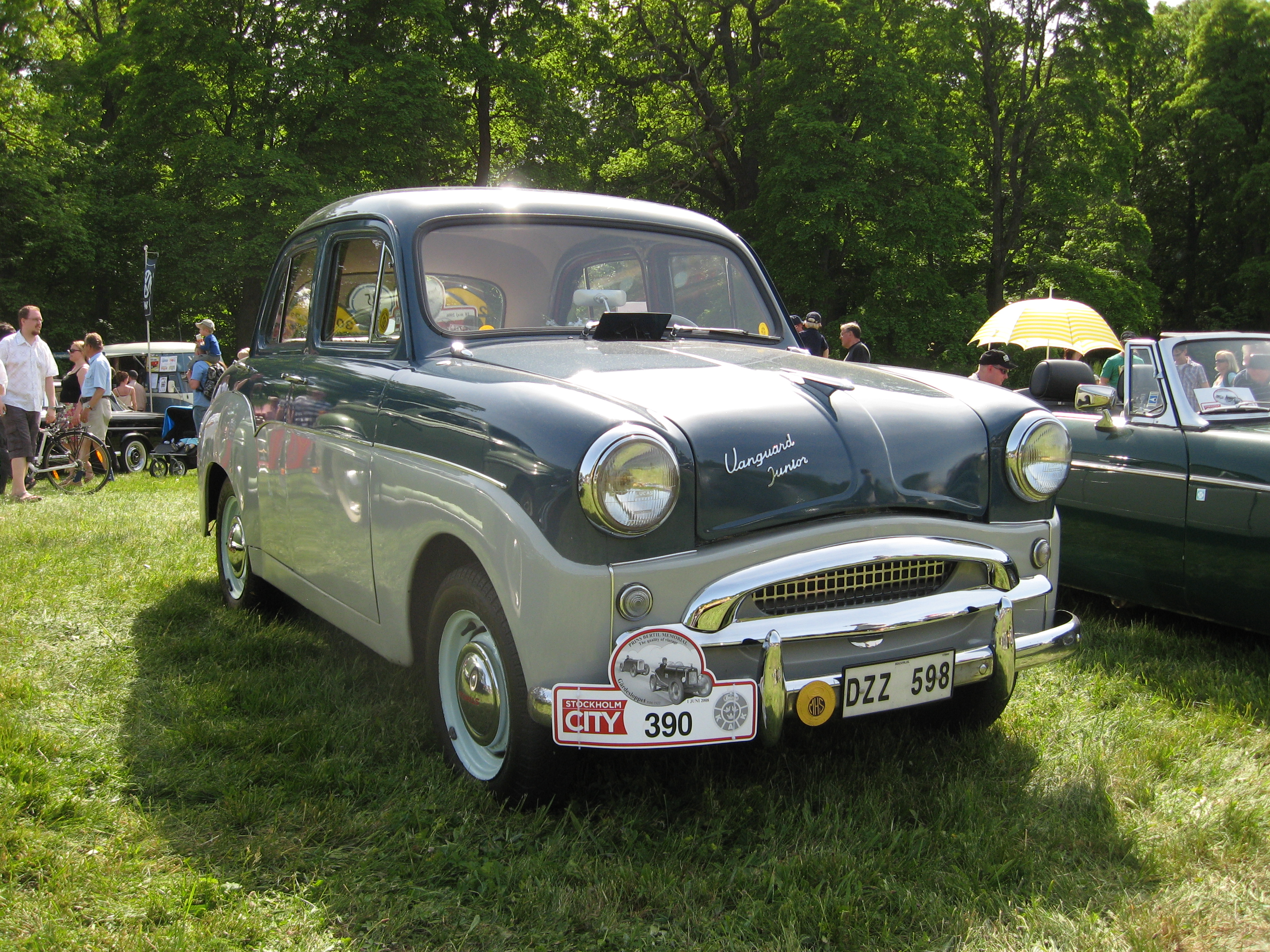
A Scandinavian Standard Ten badged as the Vanguard Junior

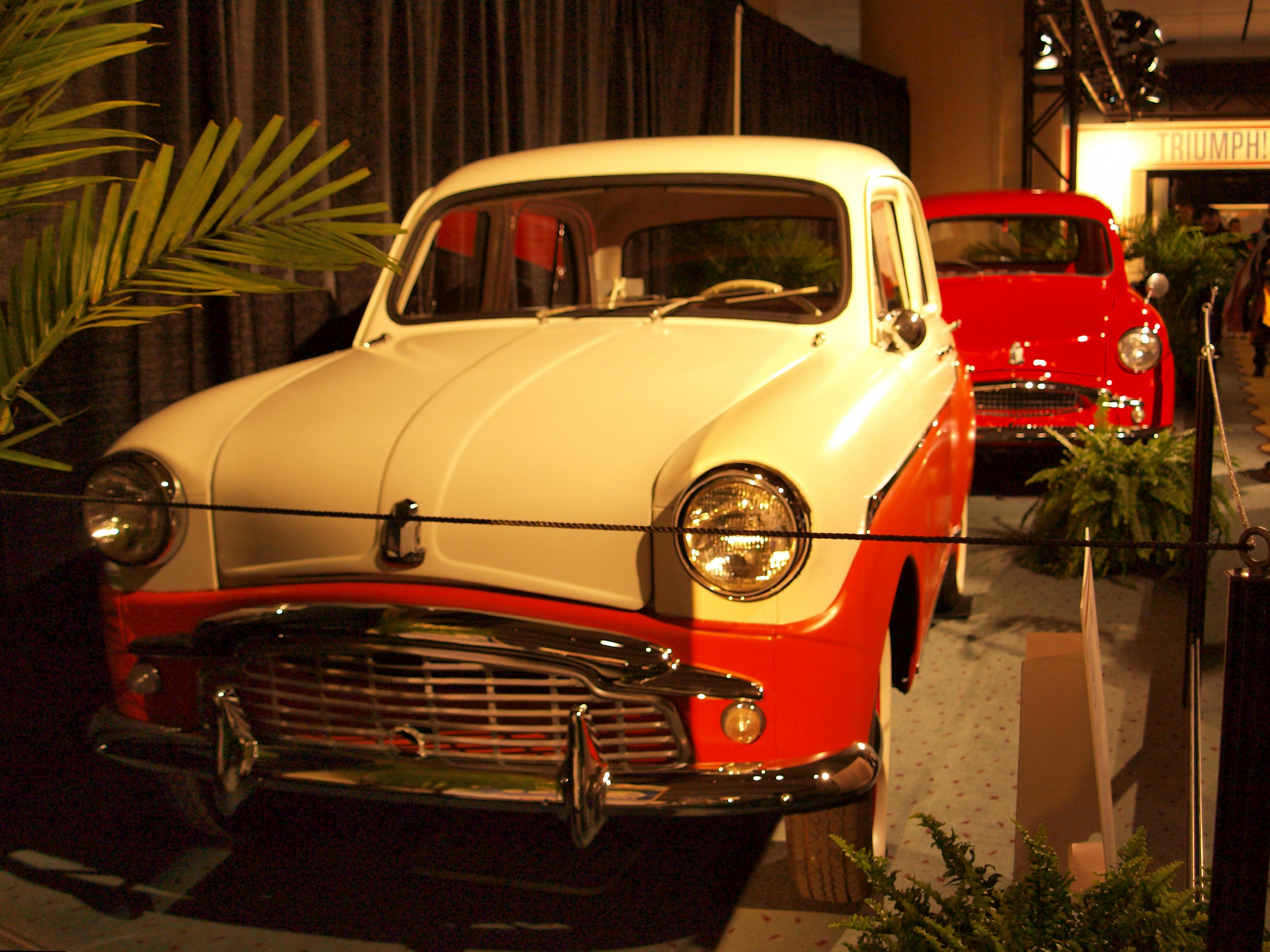
Triumph 10 (Canada)

== Standard Pennant ==
Standard Pennant
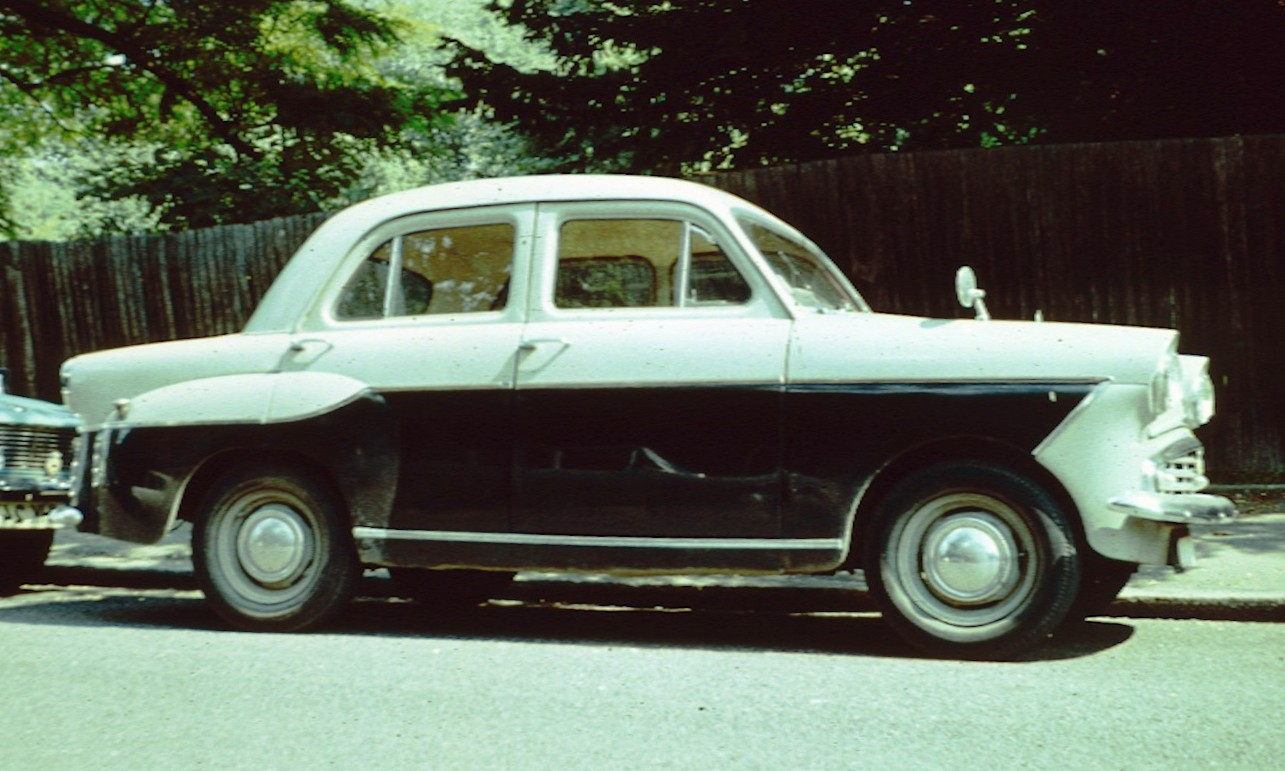

Overview
- Also called: Standard 10 (India)
- Production: 1957–1960; 42,910 made

Body and chassis
- Body style: 4-door saloon
- Related: Standard Atlas

Powertrain
- Engine: 948 cc OHV I4
- Transmission: Four-speed manual optional overdrive

Dimensions
- Wheelbase: 84 in (2,134 mm)
- Length: 142 in (3,607 mm)
- Width: 59 in (1,499 mm)
- Height: 60 in (1,524 mm)

A tail-finned (with optional two-tone paint schemes) version of the Ten, the Standard Pennant was launched in October 1957. Engine power was increased to 37 bhp (28 kW) and an overdrive gearbox was offered as an option. other options included a radio, heater, leather upholstery and clutchless two-pedal control. Indian-produced Pennants were branded as "Standard 10", and lacked any bootlid trim other than the branding.

A Pennant tested by British magazine The Motor in 1958 had a top speed of 70.2 mph (113 km/h) and could accelerate from 0–60 mph (97 km/h) in 35.3 seconds. A fuel consumption of 40.2 miles per imperial gallon (7.03 L/100 km; 33.5 mpg_{‑US}) was recorded. The test car cost £728, including taxes of £243.

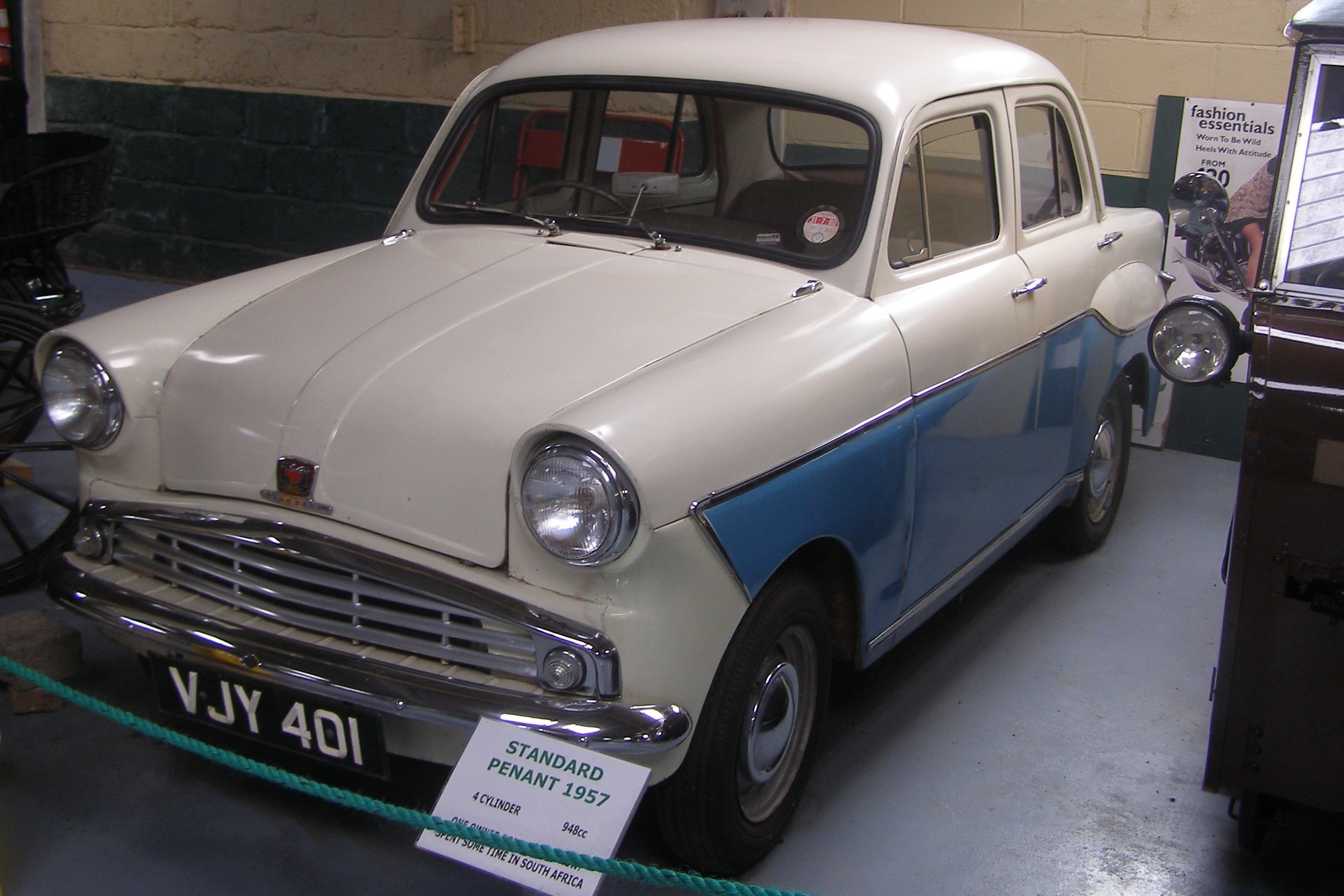
A 1957 Pennant
