= Single vehicle approval =

The single vehicle approval is a test introduced in 1998 by the British government to determine the road worthiness of a vehicle not type approved within the UK, on a one off basis. Typically used by 'kit cars', very low volume production vehicles, and personally imported cars, allowing these cars to be used legally on the roads for a reasonable fee.

== IVA ==
In 2009 individual vehicle approval began replacing the SVA and is now the test used for the majority of vehicle types previously tested with the SVA test. Standards required are more stringent and test fees are higher.
