= Foton Toano Grand-V =

Light commercial van

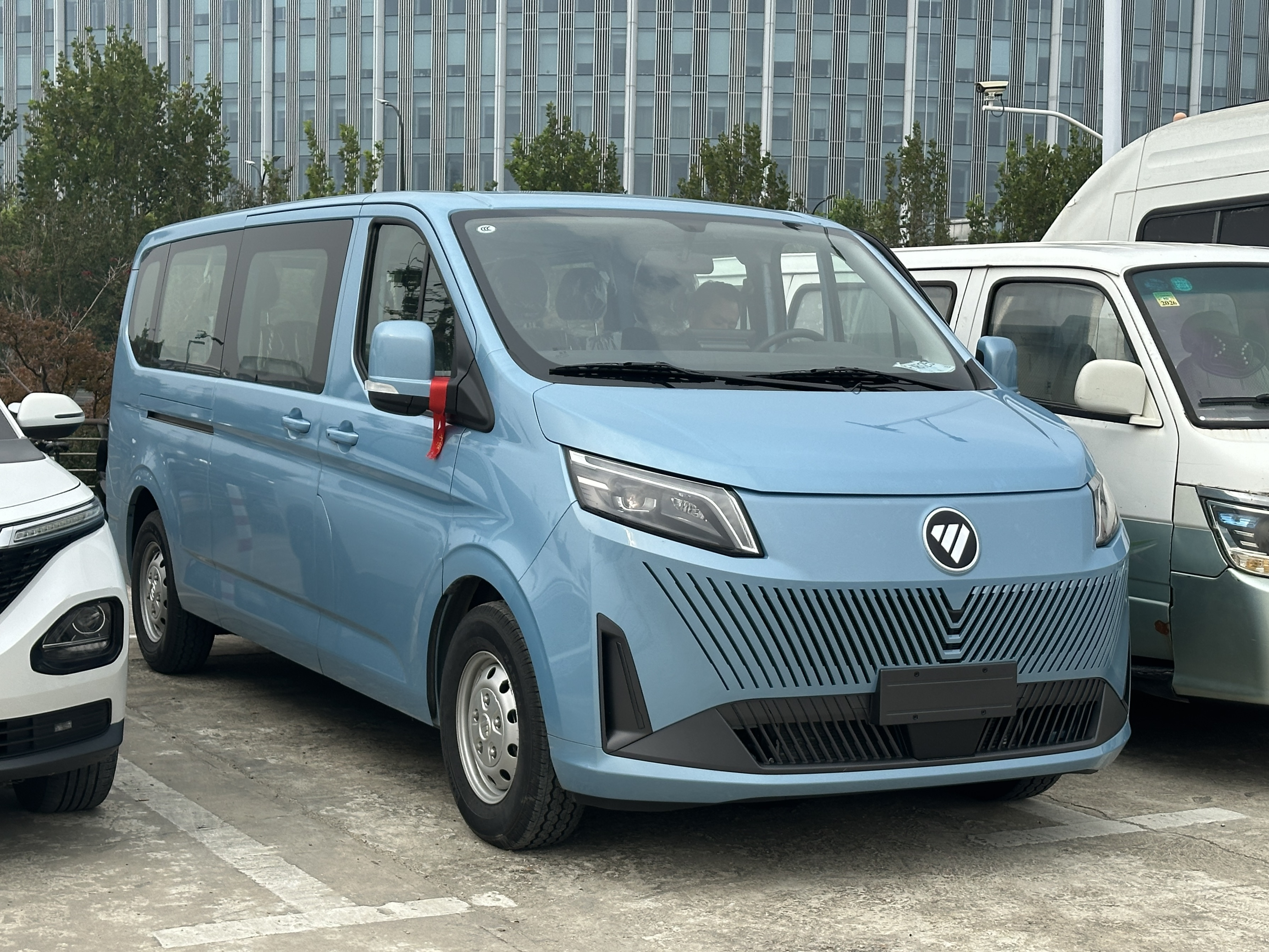

Overview
- Manufacturer: Foton Motor
- Production: 2024–present
- Assembly: China

Body and chassis
- Class: Light commercial vehicle (M)
- Body style: 4-door van; 4-door minibus
- Layout: Front-engine, front-wheel-drive (diesel/hybrid); Front-engine, front-wheel-drive (EV)

Dimensions
- Wheelbase: 3,750 mm (147.6 in)
- Length: 5,995 mm (236.0 in)
- Width: 2,000 mm (78.7 in)
- Height: 2,415 mm (95.1 in)
- Curb weight: 2,546–3,671 kg (5,613–8,093 lb)

The Foton Toano Grand-V is a light commercial van produced by Foton since 2024.

== Overview ==
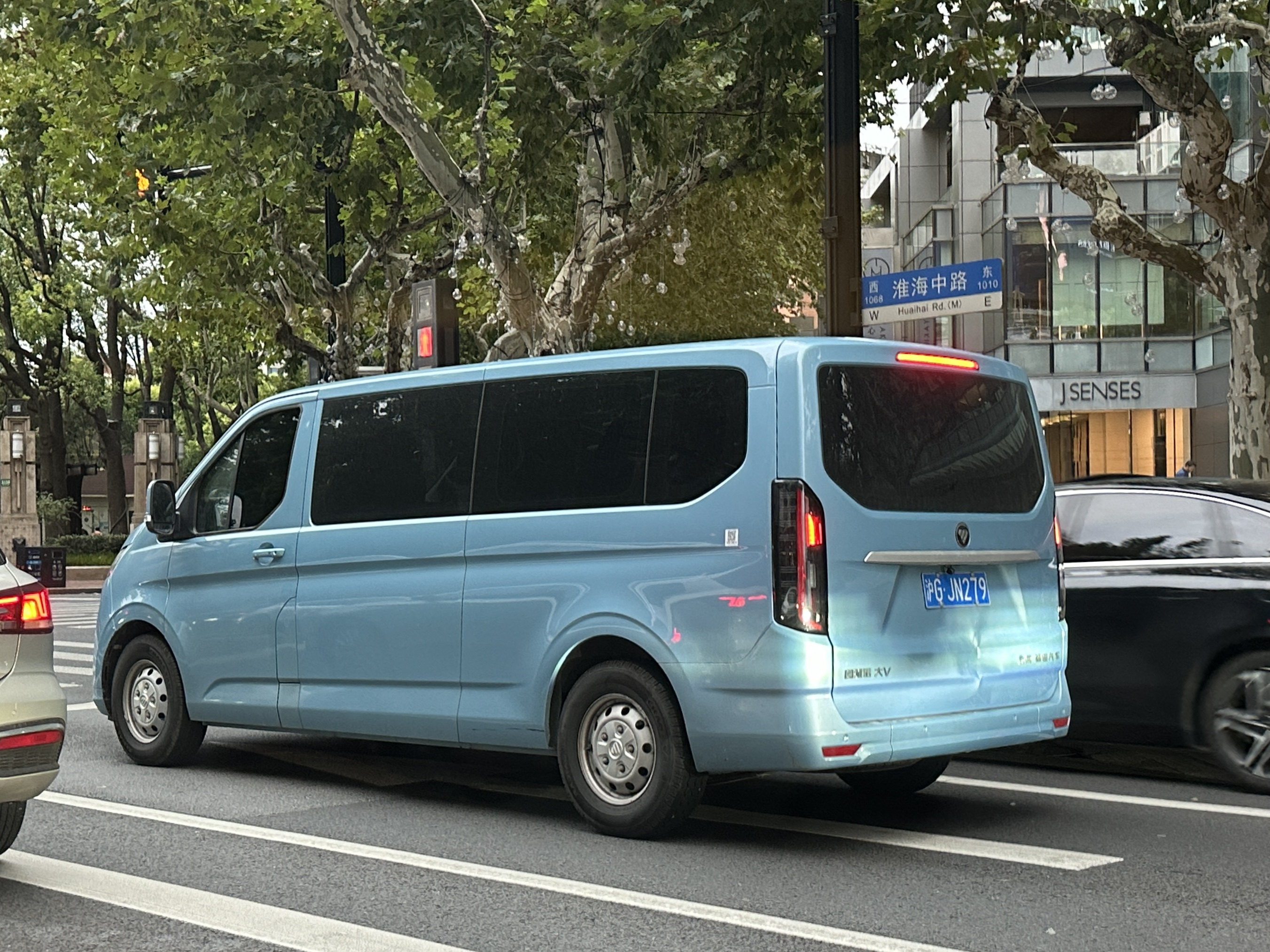
Rear view

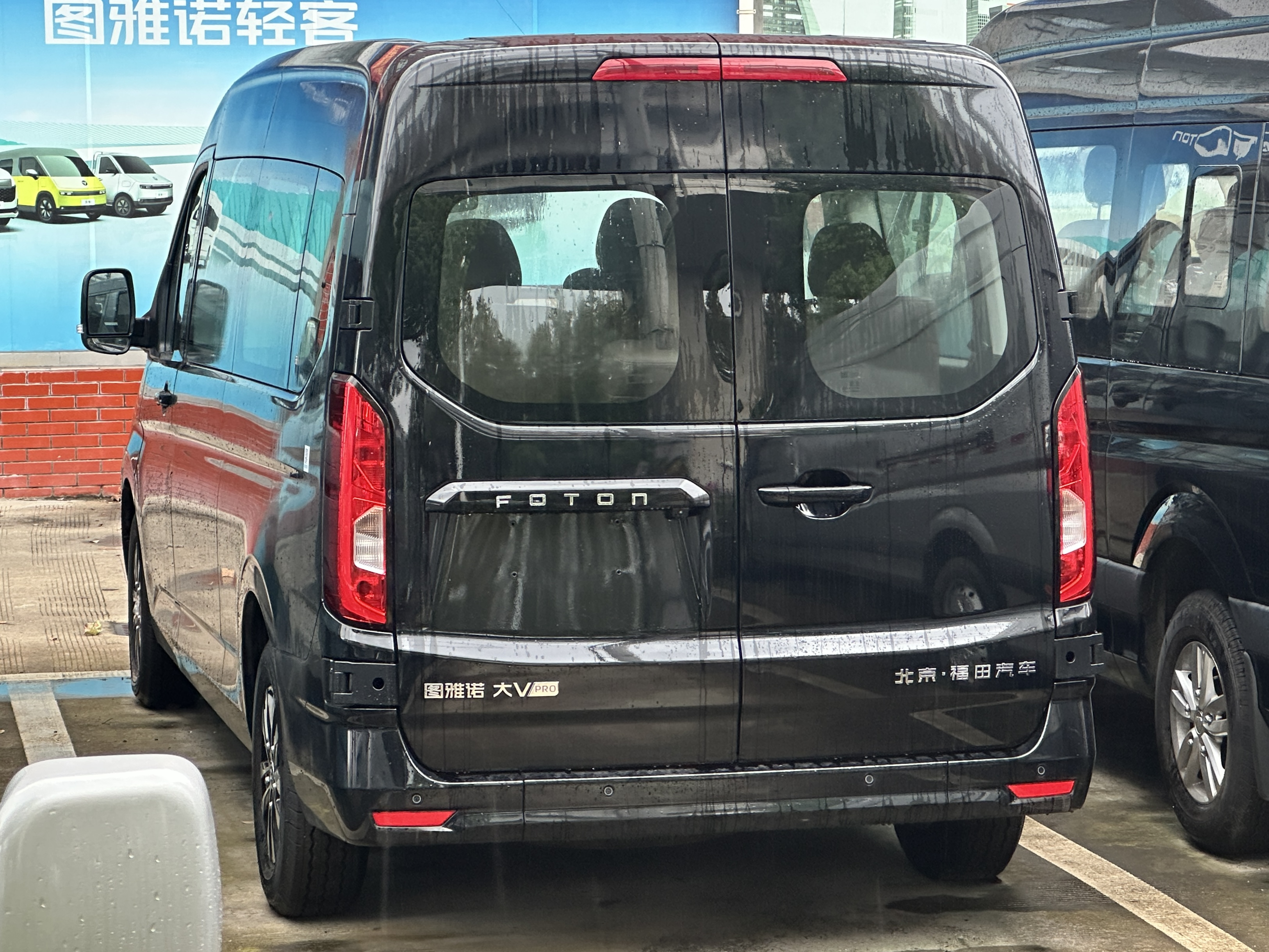
The Foton Toano Grand-V Pro variant with rear barn doors.

The Toano Grand-V was launched on 18 June 2024, with both commercial and passenger variants available. The commercial variant offers 6 to 10 cubic meters (212–353 cubic feet) of cargo space, while the passenger variants comes as a 9–12 seater depending on the configuration. Powertrain includes a diesel engine, a hybrid system or a battery-electric powertrain.

The diesel variant is powered by a 2.0 liter turbo inline-four engine producing 113 kW (152 hp) mated to a 5-speed or 6-speed manual transmission.

== Foton Toano Grand-V EV ==
The Toano Grand-V EV is the electric variant of the Grand-V. Three battery sizes are available for 300, 400 and 500 kilometers of range. The 400 km range variant is equipped with a battery capacity of 77 kWh.

== Foton Toano X5/Toano X6 ==
Based on the Toano Grand-V, The Toano X5 and Toano X6 variants were launched in April 2025. The X5 is designed for logistics, while the X6 is the name for more premium passenger models. Both variants feature a more prominent front grille design compared to the regular Foton Toano Grand-V.

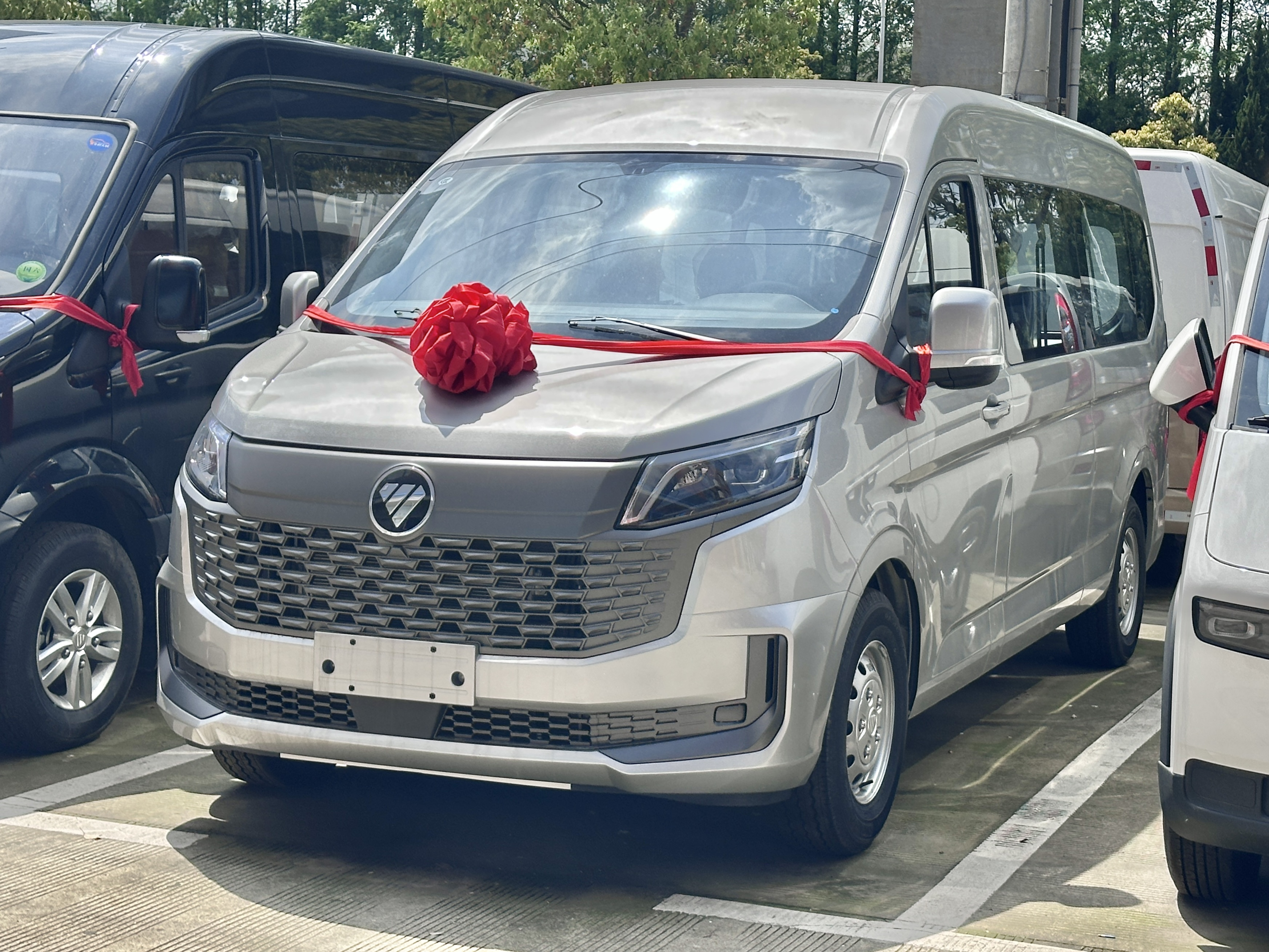
Foton Toano X5
