= BYD M3 =

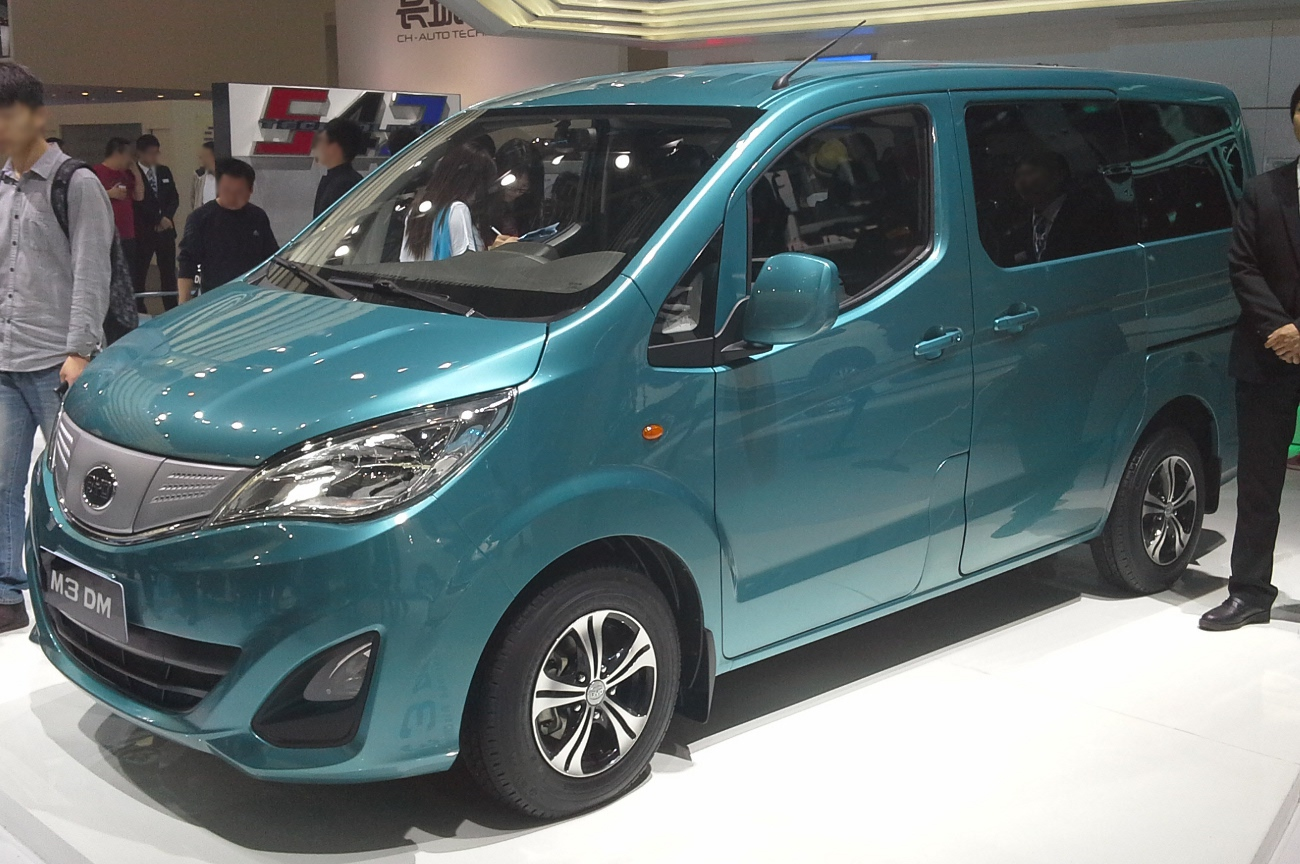
- BYD M3 DM

Overview
- Manufacturer: BYD Auto
- Also called: BYD Shang; BYD M3; BYD T3; BYD ETP3 (Europe)
- Production: 2014–present
- Assembly: China; Thailand: Bangkok (BYD Thailand by Siam ATR)

Body and chassis
- Class: Light commercial vehicle/Leisure activity vehicle (M)
- Body style: 5-door van
- Layout: Front engine, front-wheel drive layout Front-motor, front-wheel-drive (EV)

Powertrain
- Engine: 1.5 L BYD476ZQA I4 (turbo petrol); 1.5 L BYD476ZQA I4 109hp (turbo petrol) + 150hp electric motor (DM)
- Electric motor: Permanent-magnet synchronous motors (DM); AC Permanent Magnet Synchronous Motor (EV)
- Power output: 118 kW (160 PS; 158 hp); 70 kW (95 PS; 94 hp); 100 kW (136 PS; 134 hp) (ETP3); 70 kW (95 PS; 94 hp)
- Transmission: CVT; Fixed-ratio (EV)
- Hybrid drivetrain: PHEV
- Battery: 15.98 kWh (PHEV); 44.9 kWh LiFePO4; 50.3 kWh BYD NCM Battery
- Electric range: 300 km (190 mi) (EV)

Dimensions
- Wheelbase: 2,725 mm (107.3 in)
- Length: 4,460 mm (175.6 in)
- Width: 1,720 mm (67.7 in)
- Height: 1,875 mm (73.8 in)

The BYD M3, also marketed as the BYD ETP3 in Europe and BYD T3 is a 5-door van designed and produced by the Chinese automaker BYD Auto since 2014.

== BYD M3 and M3 DM ==
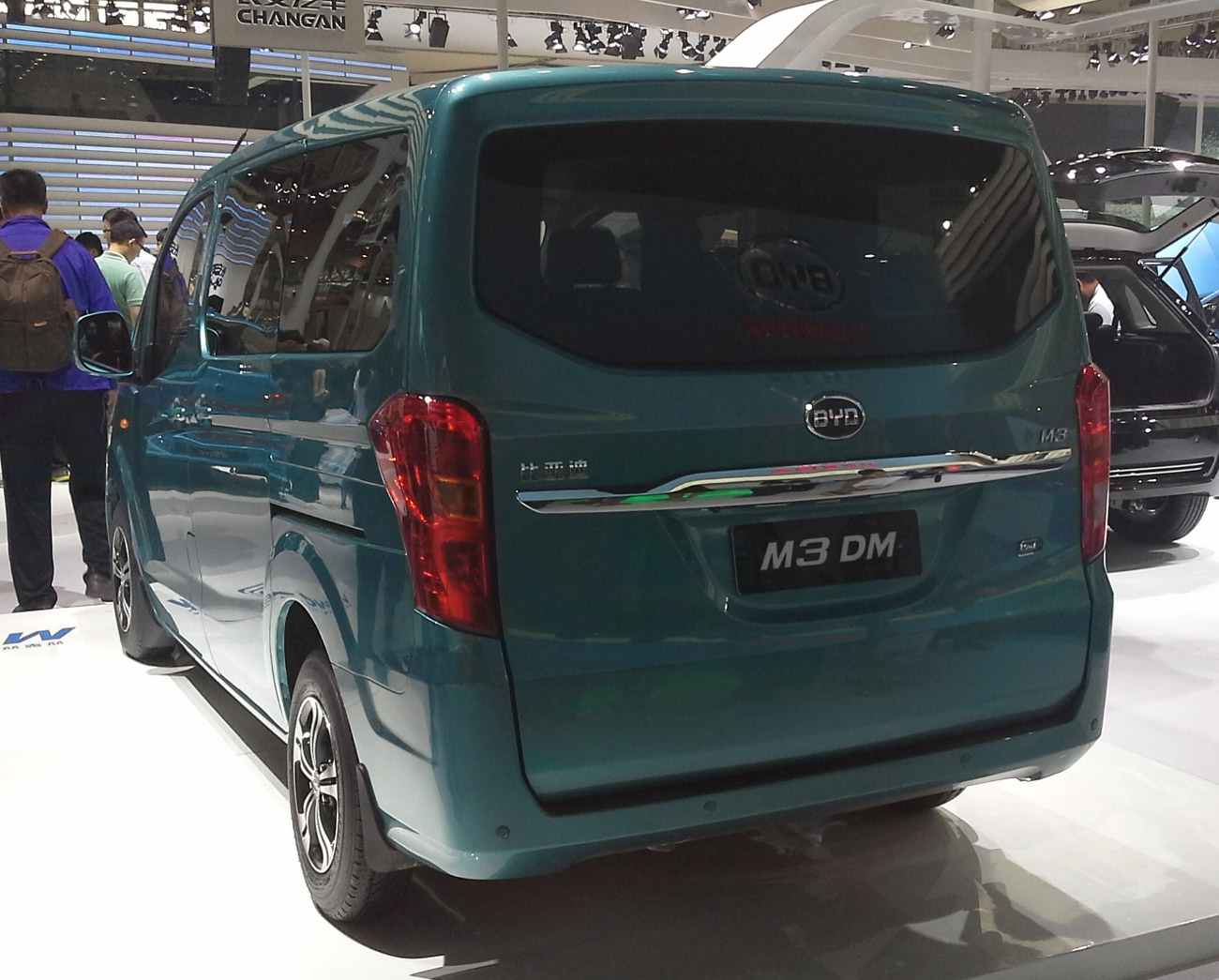
BYD M3 DM rear

The BYD M3 DM mini MPV was previewed by the M3 DM Concept during the 2014 Beijing Auto Show, with the DM meaning Dual-Mode for hybrid drivetrain BYD models.

The M3 DM is powered by a dual-mode hybrid drivetrain, consisting of a 1.5 liter four-cylinder petrol engine producing 109 hp and an electric motor producing 150 hp, good for a combined output of 259 hp. The 0–100 acceleration claimed by BYD is 7.5 seconds. Range of the M3 DM in pure electric mode is 60 kilometers.

The internal combustion version is the BYD M3 which features the same design with traditional grilles.

== BYD T3 ==
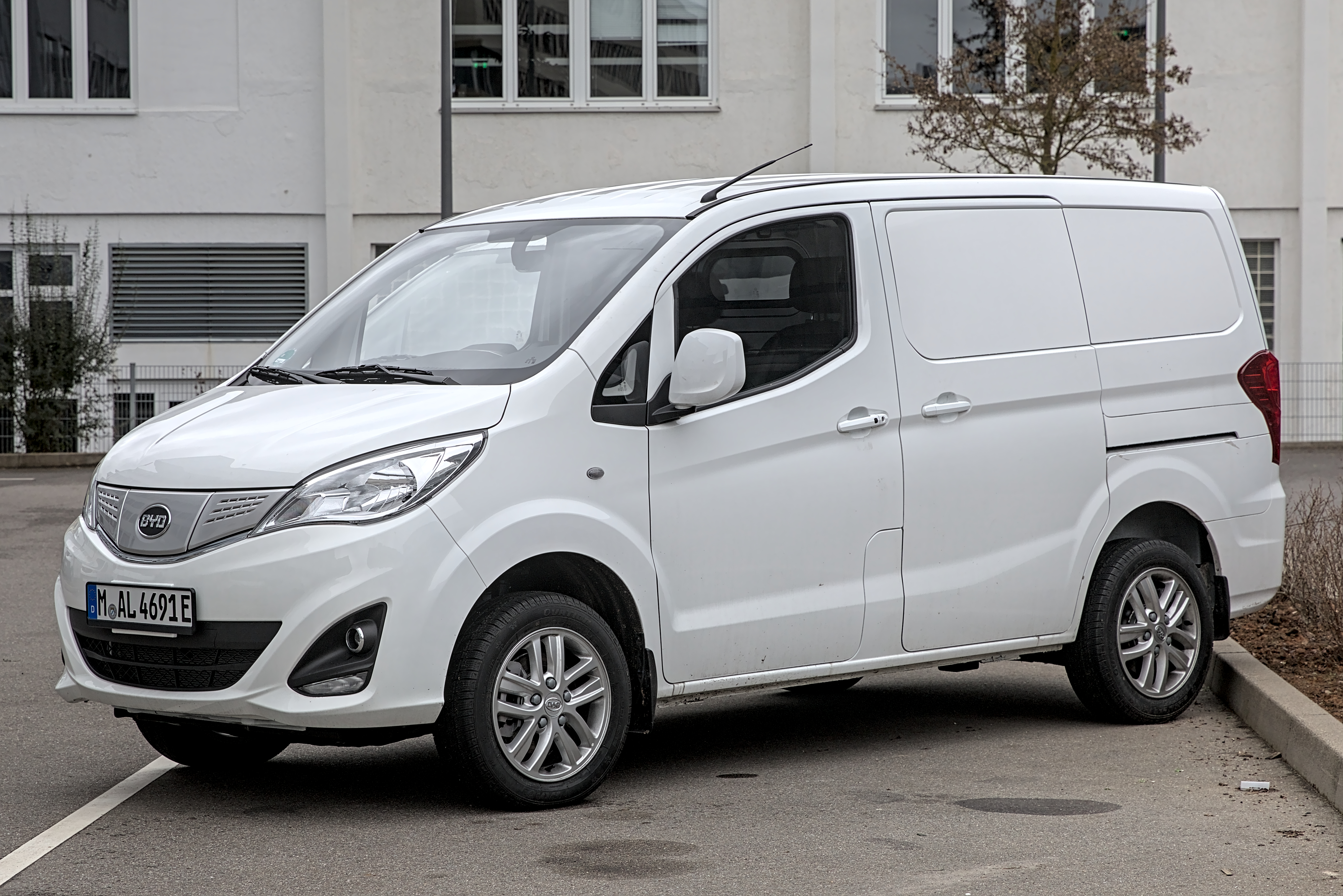
BYD T3 front

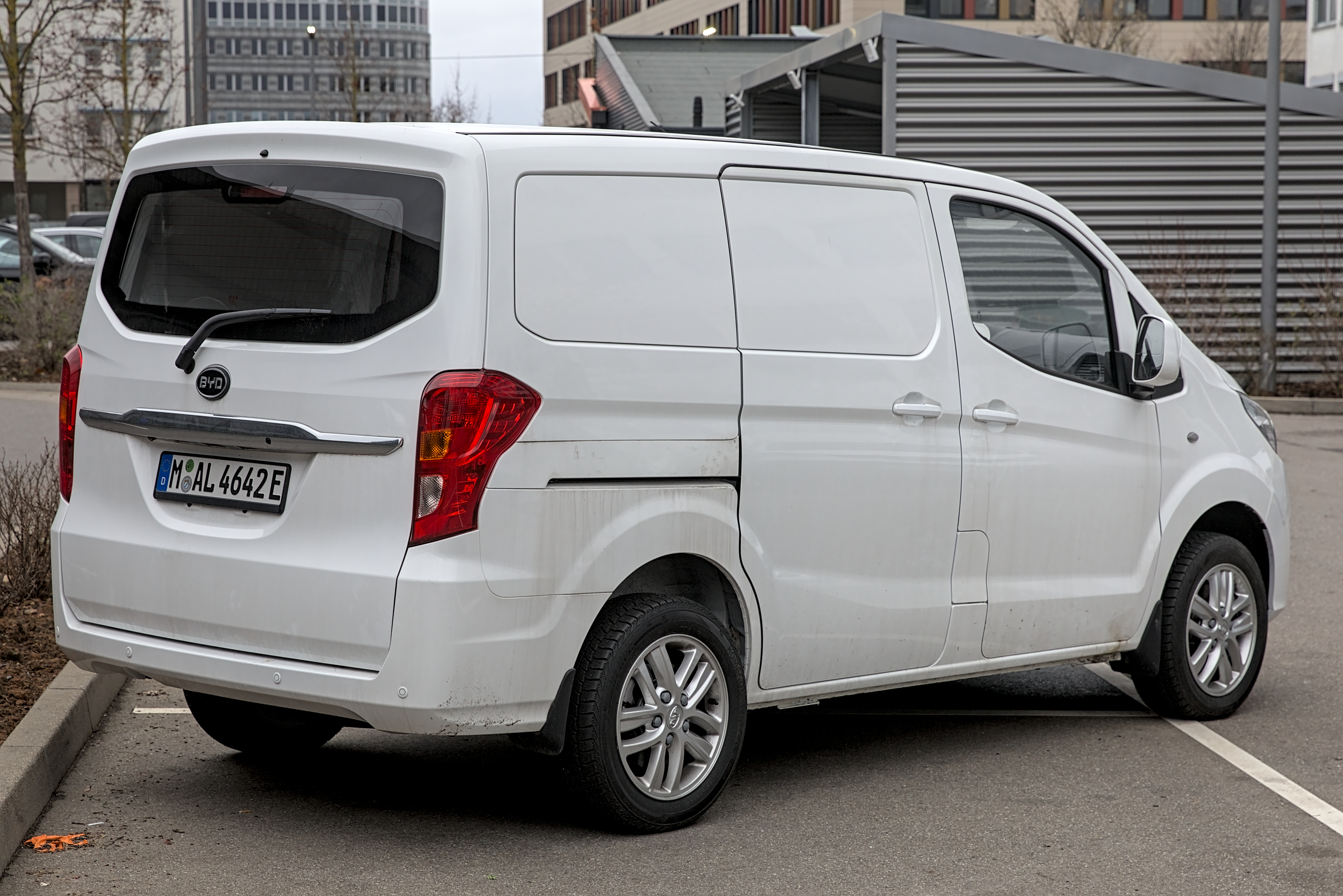
BYD T3 rear

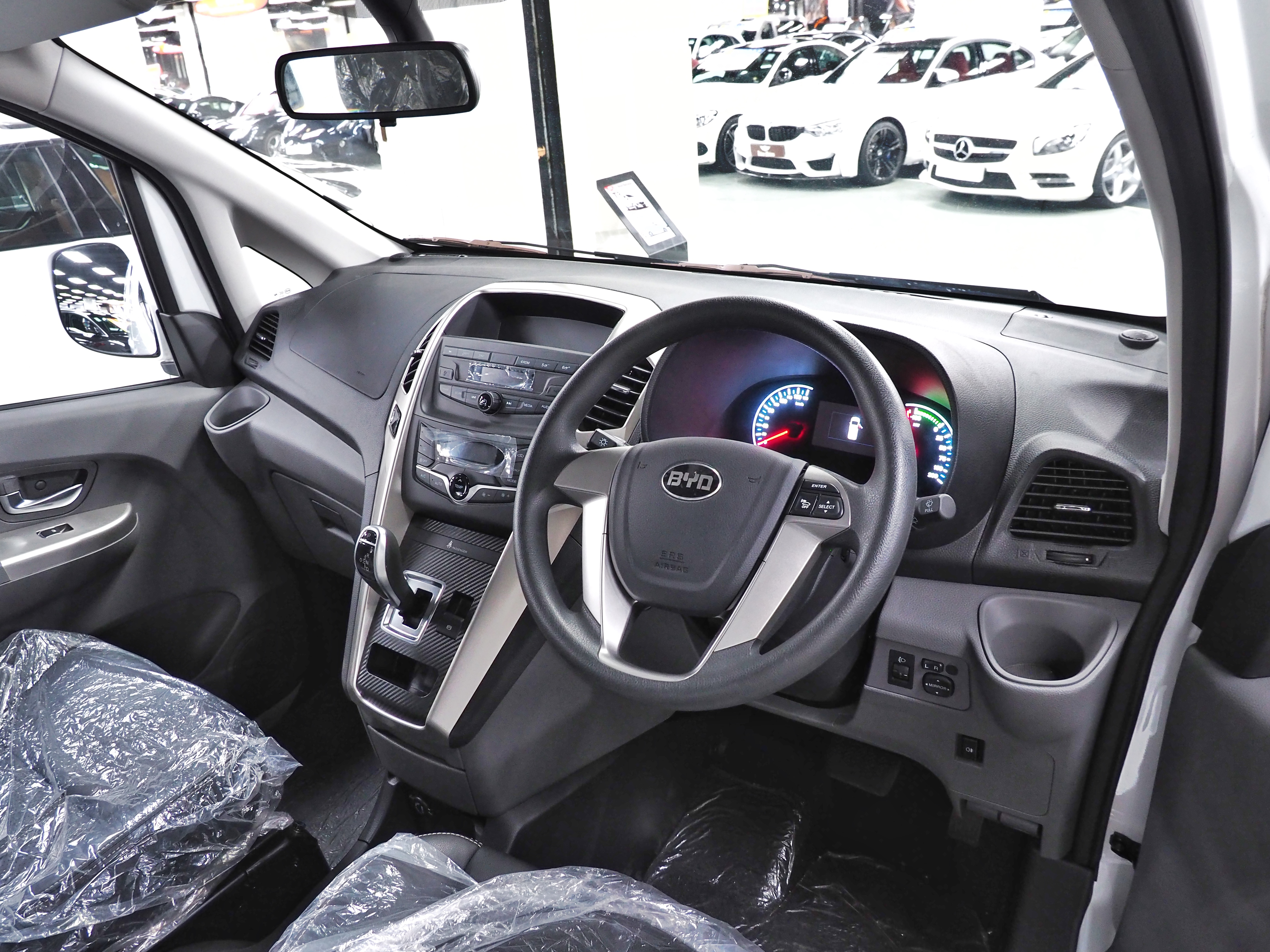
BYD T3 interior

The BYD T3 is a pure-electric mini van launched by BYD at the 2015 Shanghai Auto Show, and is the electric version of the BYD M3 light commercial vehicle. It was never actually made available to the market, but Chinese government officials such as post offices were able to acquire fleets to be used as state-financed vehicles. The T3 name was originally used on a truck or commercial van version of the BYD e6 prototype. However the vehicle that was finally released wearing the BYD T3 nameplate shares the platform with the BYD M3.

In China, BYD supplied T3 to DHL, which provides daily logistics in the Central Business District (CBD) of Shenzhen and surrounding areas.

Outside China, BYD exported T3 to Norway, to Australia via EVDirect and to Thailand via DKSH Thailand. DKSH Thailand is a provider of market expansion services in Asia, has partnered with Loxley Plc to trial the use of BYD's T3 100% electric van at DKSH's Bang Na distribution centre to tackle air pollution and promote zero-emission solutions.
