= GAZelle NEXT =

Russian light commercial vehicle

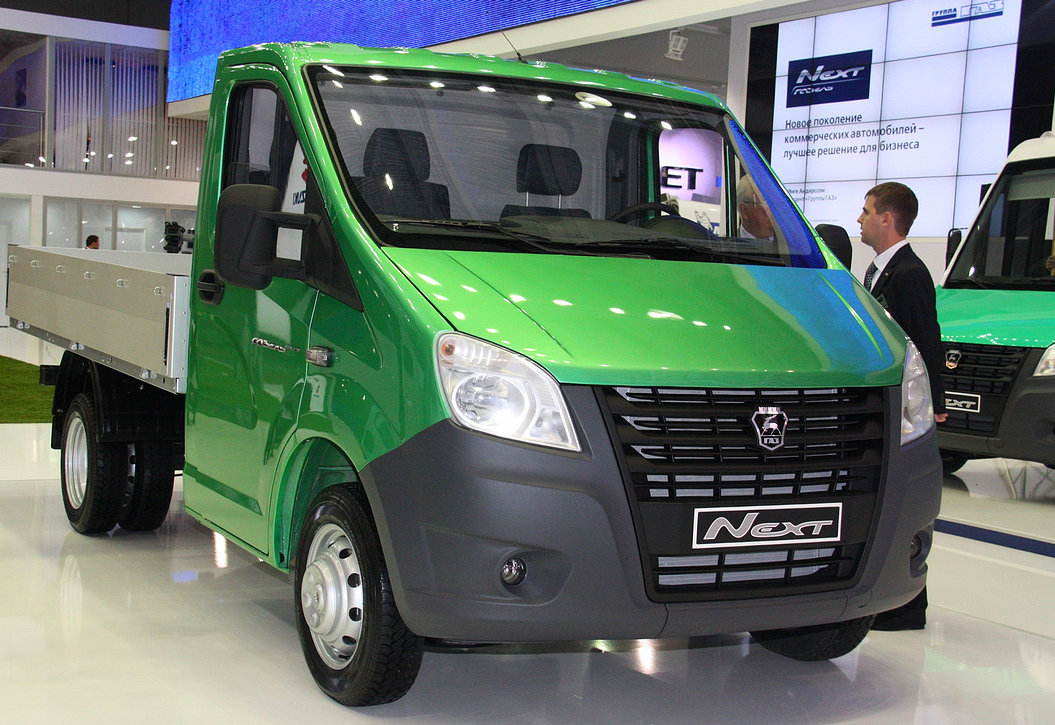

Overview
- Manufacturer: GAZ
- Production: 2013–present
- Assembly: Russia: Nizhny Novgorod (GAZ); Turkey: Sakarya (Mersa Otomotiv); Azerbaijan: Haciqabul (Azərmaş)

Body and chassis
- Class: Light commercial vehicle (M)
- Body style: Van; Pickup truck Minibus chassis cab cut away
- Layout: FR layout

Powertrain
- Engine: 2.7 L UMZ Evotech E-4 I4; 2781 cc Cummins ISF2 8s4129Р I4
- Transmission: 5-speed manual

Dimensions
- Wheelbase: 110.24 in (2,800 mm)
- Length: 221.7 in (5,631 mm)
- Width: 81.42 in (2,068 mm)
- Height: 84.134 in (2,137 mm)

Chronology
- Predecessor: GAZelle

The GAZelle NEXT is an updated version of the original GAZelle series of medium duty vans and trucks produced by the Russian automotive company GAZ. It is produced alongside the original GAZelle, which is now known as the GAZelle Business.

The first available model was equipped with a four-cylinder turbo diesel motor from Cummins, which has 129 horsepower at 3600 rpm. The engine meets the Euro 4 and Euro 5 emission standards.

On 10 April 2013, series production of GAZelle NEXT was started. During the “Best Commercial Vehicle in Russia – 2013” contest, it received first place in the Best Van\Light-Duty Truck category. 7 March 2014, the serial production of Gazelle NEXT with a double cab began. 24 March, the production of Gazelle NEXT Cityline bus. In May 2014, GAZ received Single European vehicle type approval, which allowed them to sell the Gazelle NEXT within the European Union. In 2015, The most popular model in the LCV market for Russia was the GAZelle NEXT – with 12 971 units sold, down from 2014 by 35.5%. In September 2015, the Comtrans exhibition in Moscow included a panel van and minibus on this base. Sales of the panel van started in April 2016 and the minibus in November 2016.

== Models ==
- GAZ-А21R22-20 flatbed truck
- GAZ-А21R32-10 flatbed truck with extended wheelbase
- GAZ-А22R22-10 flatbed truck with double cab
- GAZ-А22R32-20 flatbed truck with double cab and extended wheelbase
- GAZ-А23R22-0011-26 refrigerator truck
- GAZ-А23R32-0011-26 refrigerator truck with extended wheelbase
- GAZ-А23R32-0011-18-641 manufactured goods van
- GAZ-А23R32-0011-18-041 manufactured goods van with extended wheelbase
- Ambulance car modular class "B"
- Ambulance car modular class "C"
- GAZ-А64R42 small urban bus
- GAZ-А63R42 small suburban bus

== Trim levels ==
There are 3 trim levels: Basic, Comfort 1 and Comfort 2.

Basic includes power steering, cruise control, alarm door open position, stabilizers front and rear, adjustable lighting of the dashboard, on-board computer, heated side mirrors, electric power windows, audiopreparation, washer tank capacity of five liters, central locking, driver's seat with adjustable and armrest, steering column with height adjustment, heater radiator, lighter, tool kit.

In Comfort 1 adds fog lights, audiosystem, electric power door mirrors, "Lux" heated seats and lumbar support.

In Comfort 2 adds engine preheater, 85 Ah high capacity battery.

Options for all trim levels are available such as differential lock, brake system with ABS, air conditioning.

== New family (restyling): GAZelle NN (New Next) ==
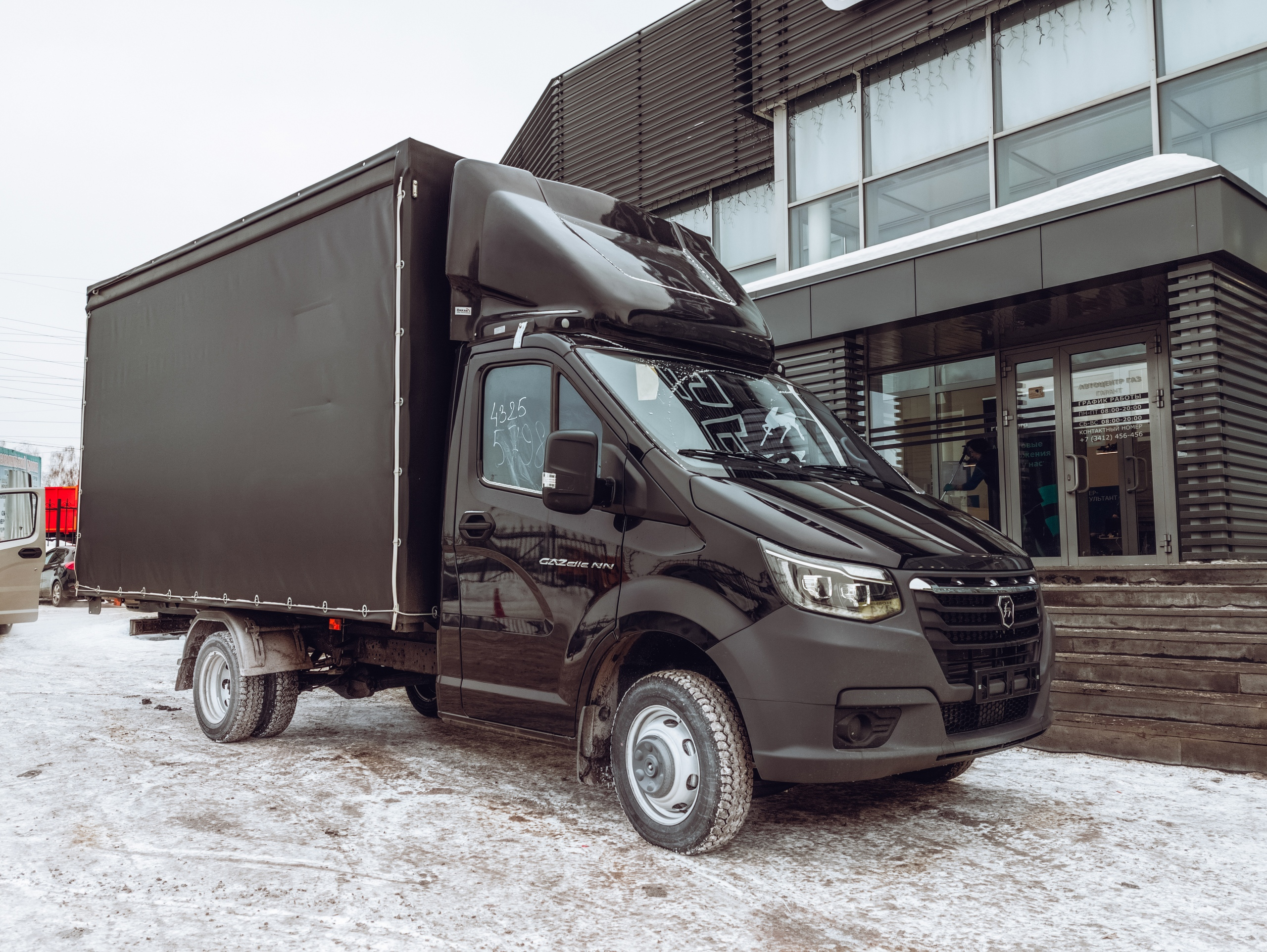
GAZelle NN

Gazelle NN (New Next) is a restyled version of Gazelle Next. The exterior of the cab of the new Gazelle features LED optics for the front headlights.

Detailed in the new version of the Russian Next, the hood has changed — it has become more embossed, the plastic front bumper has changed the side "air intakes" and another, central, radiator grille has appeared — it has received a stylish three–dimensional shape. The sidewalls remained the same, with the exception of the exterior mirror housings, which, as proposed by the Gazelle Next 2021 concept, will now be painted in body color. Inside the cabin there is a new front panel with rectangular air ducts, a full-fledged multi-steering wheel equipped with heating, and a central touch display.

To the left of it there are physical control buttons, below – a compact climate control console. The engine start button is located to the right of the steering wheel, but the compartments for small things, even if they changed their shape, they remained in their places; so, the GAZelle driver will likely be familiar with the layout.

The driver's seat has also been improved, which will become softer due to the air suspension. As for the double sofa, you can make a comfortable table out of it by folding the back. The manufacturer promised that all current engines will remain in the ranks of the new Gazelle Next 2021 model year: 2.8-liter Cummins ISF turbodiesel engines with a capacity of 120 and 150 hp, as well as a 3.0-liter Evotech gasoline engine and its equivalent, in addition to gasoline, consuming liquefied propane.

The classic 5-speed manual "box" will remain available, while the manufacturer plans to offer other options, for example, a "robot" or a new "six-speed", which is designed specifically for modifications with a new Volkswagen diesel engine.

During the VDNkh International Travel Forum “Travel!” (2014) in Moscow, GAZ, along with other companies, showcased the concept of a motorhome created on the largest wheelbase of the GAZelle NN. It was accompanied by showcases of additional features that owners could put onto their vehicle, such as car-tents, bicycle holders, and cargo boxes.

The cost of upgrading the original GAZelle to the NN version in Nizhny Novgorod is about (300,000₽) rubles.

=== Gazelle NN versions ===
==== Single cab truck (3-seater) ====
===== Standard base =====
- GAZ-A21R22-70 "Gazelle NN" (Cummins diesel)
- GAZ-A21R23-50 "Gazelle NN" (UMZ Evotech petrol)
- GAZ-A21R25-20 "Gazelle NN" (UMZ HBO UMZ Evotech)

===== Extended base =====
- GAZ-A21R32-70 "Gazelle NN" (Cummins diesel)
- GAZ-A21R33-50 "Gazelle NN" (UMZ Evotech petrol)
- GAZ-A21R35-10 "Gazelle NN" (UMZ HBO Evotech)

===== Extended base (4.6 tons) =====
- GAZ-C41R92-80 "Gazelle NN" (Cummins diesel)

==== Double cab truck (7-seater) ====
===== Standard base =====
- GAZ-A22R22-70 "Gazelle NN" (Cummins diesel)
- GAZ-A22R23-50 "Gazelle NN" (UMZ Evotech petrol)

===== Extended base =====
- GAZ-A22R32-70 "Gazelle NN" (Cummins diesel)
- GAZ-A22R33-55 "Gazelle NN" (UMZ Evotech petrol)
- GAZ-A22R35-20 "Gazelle NN" (UMZ HBO Evotech)

===== Extended base (4.6 tons) =====
- GAZ-C42R92-80 "Gazelle NN" (Cummins diesel)

=== Van ===
==== Standard (3-seater) ====
===== Standard base =====
- GAZ-A31R32-80 "Gazelle NN" (Cummins diesel)
- GAZ-A31R23-60 "Gazelle NN" (UMZ Evotech petrol)

===== Extended base =====
- GAZ-A31R33-60 "Gazelle NN" (UMZ Evotech petrol)

===== Extended base (4.6 tons) =====
- GAZ-C45R92-80 "Gazelle NN" (Cummins diesel)

=== Combi (7-seater) ===
==== Standard base ====
- GAZ-A32R22-80 "Gazelle NN" (Cummins diesel)
- GAZ-A32R23-60 "Gazelle NN" (UMZ Evotech petrol)

==== Extended base ====
- GAZ-A32R32-80 "Gazelle NN" (Cummins diesel)
- GAZ-A32R33-60 "Gazelle NN" (UMZ Evotech petrol)

==== Extended base (4.6 tons) ====
- GAZ-C46R92-80 "Gazelle NN" (Cummins diesel)

== Projects/models based on GAZelle NEXT and NN ==
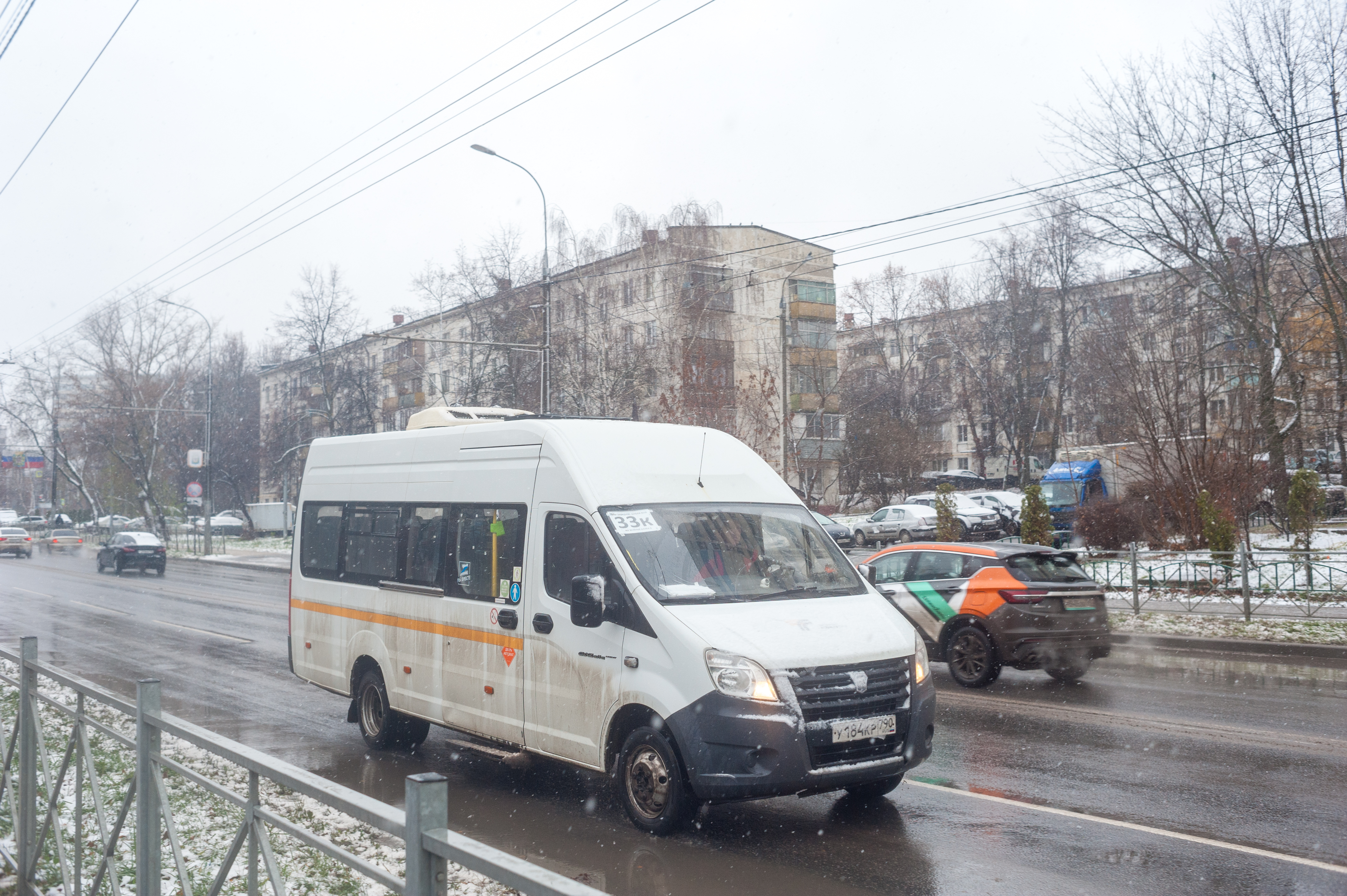
GAZelle NEXT minibus

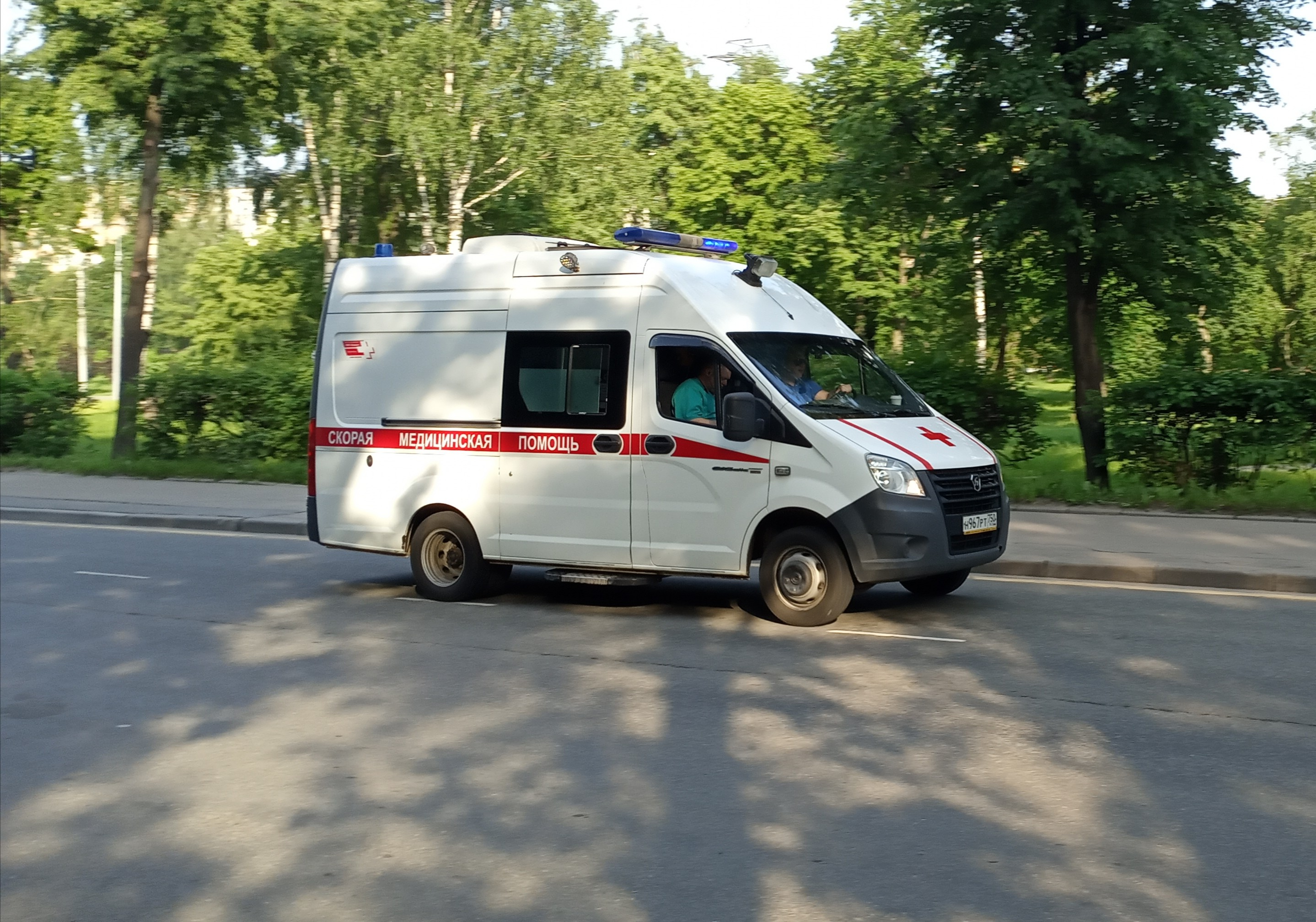
GAZelle NEXT ambulance in Moscow

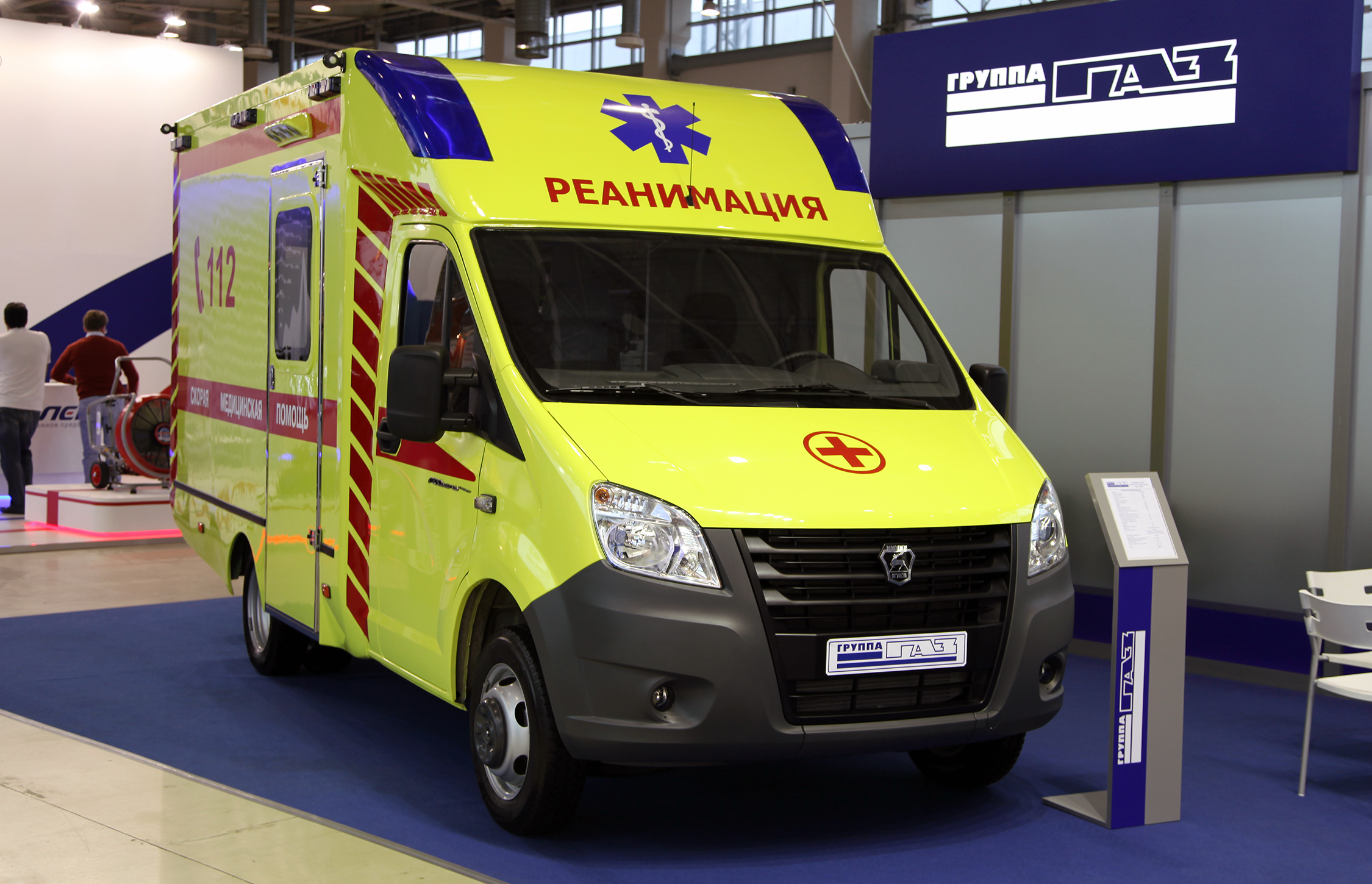
Ambulance prototype

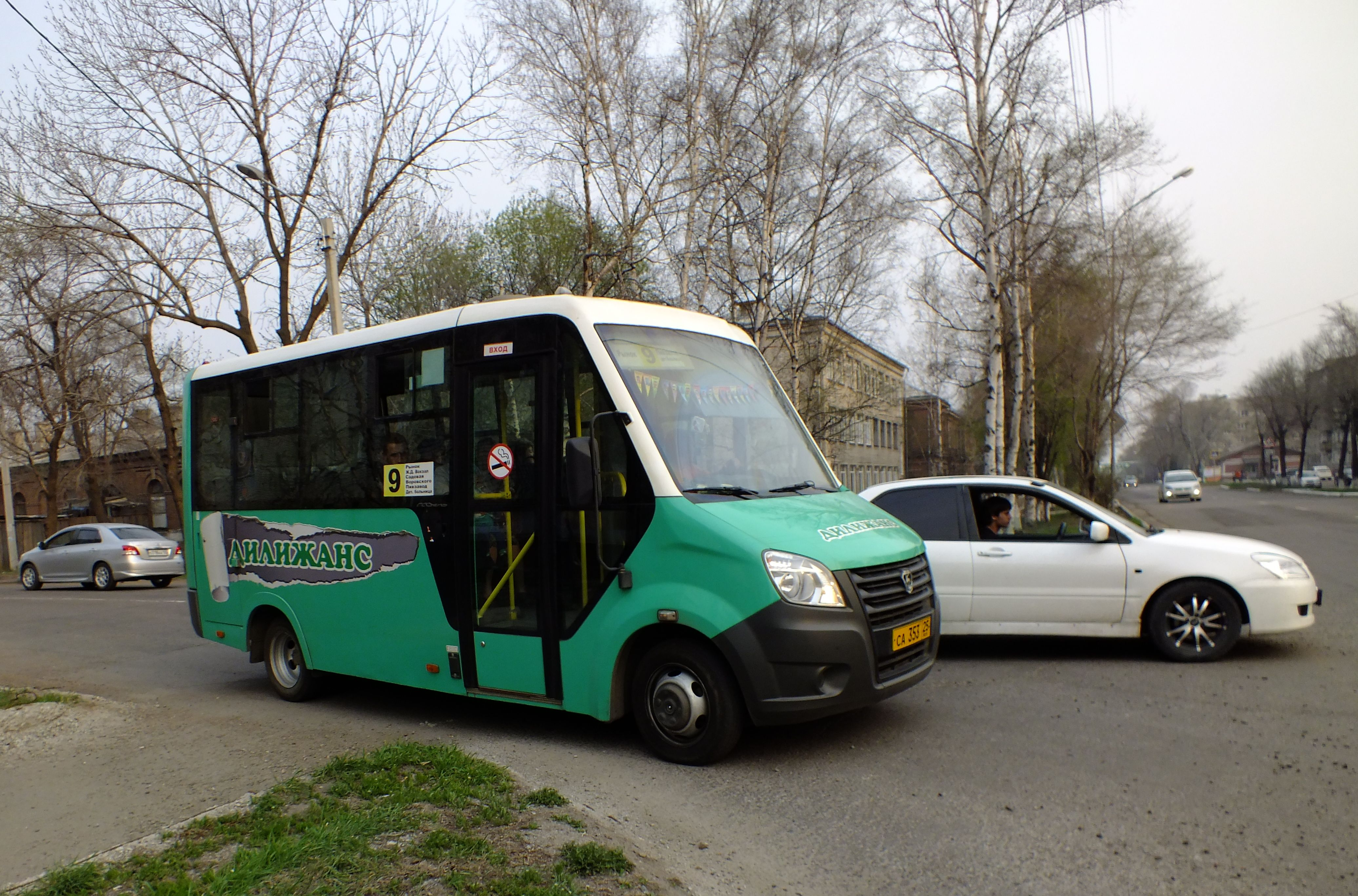
GAZelle Citiline

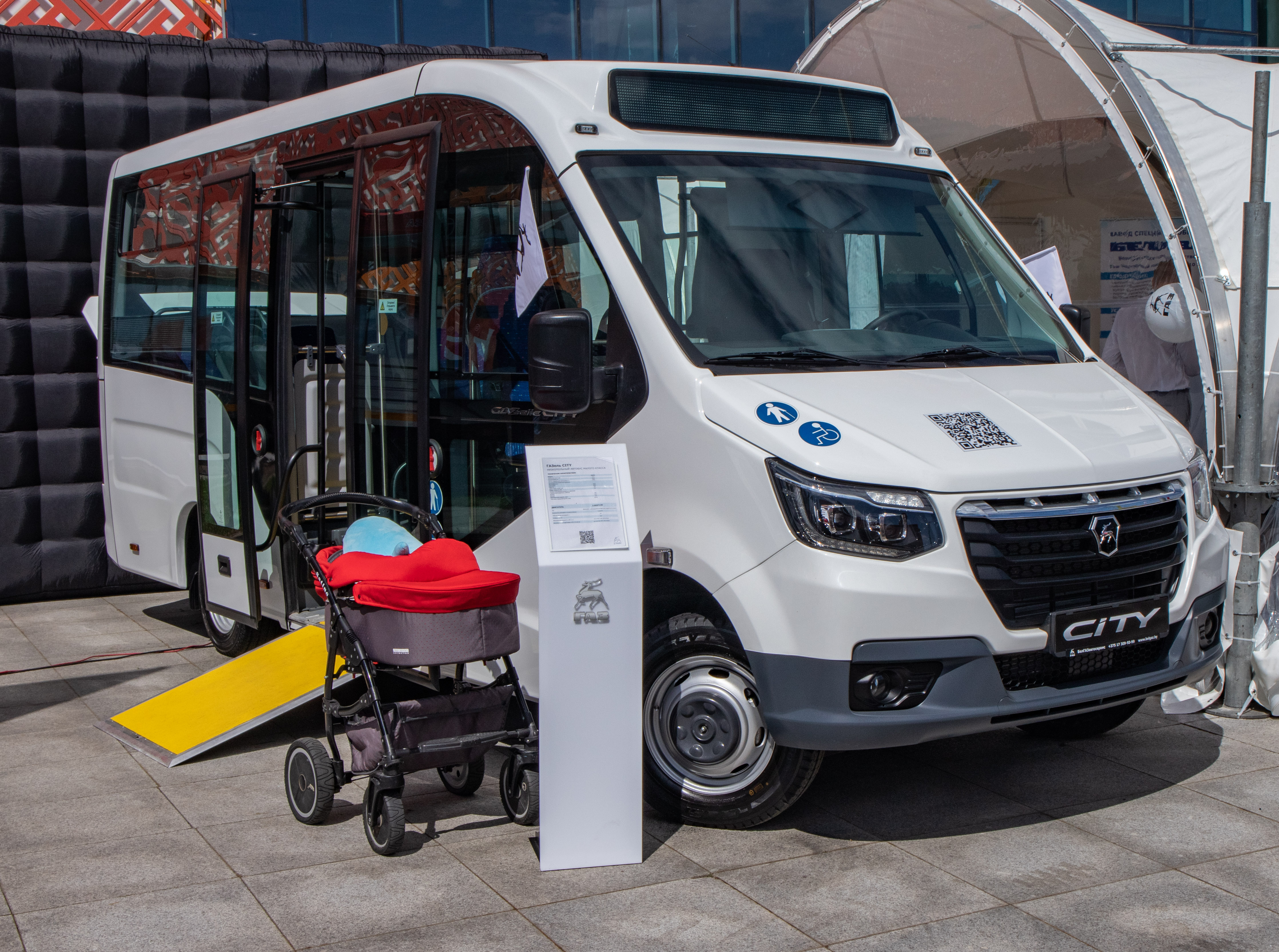
GAZelle City

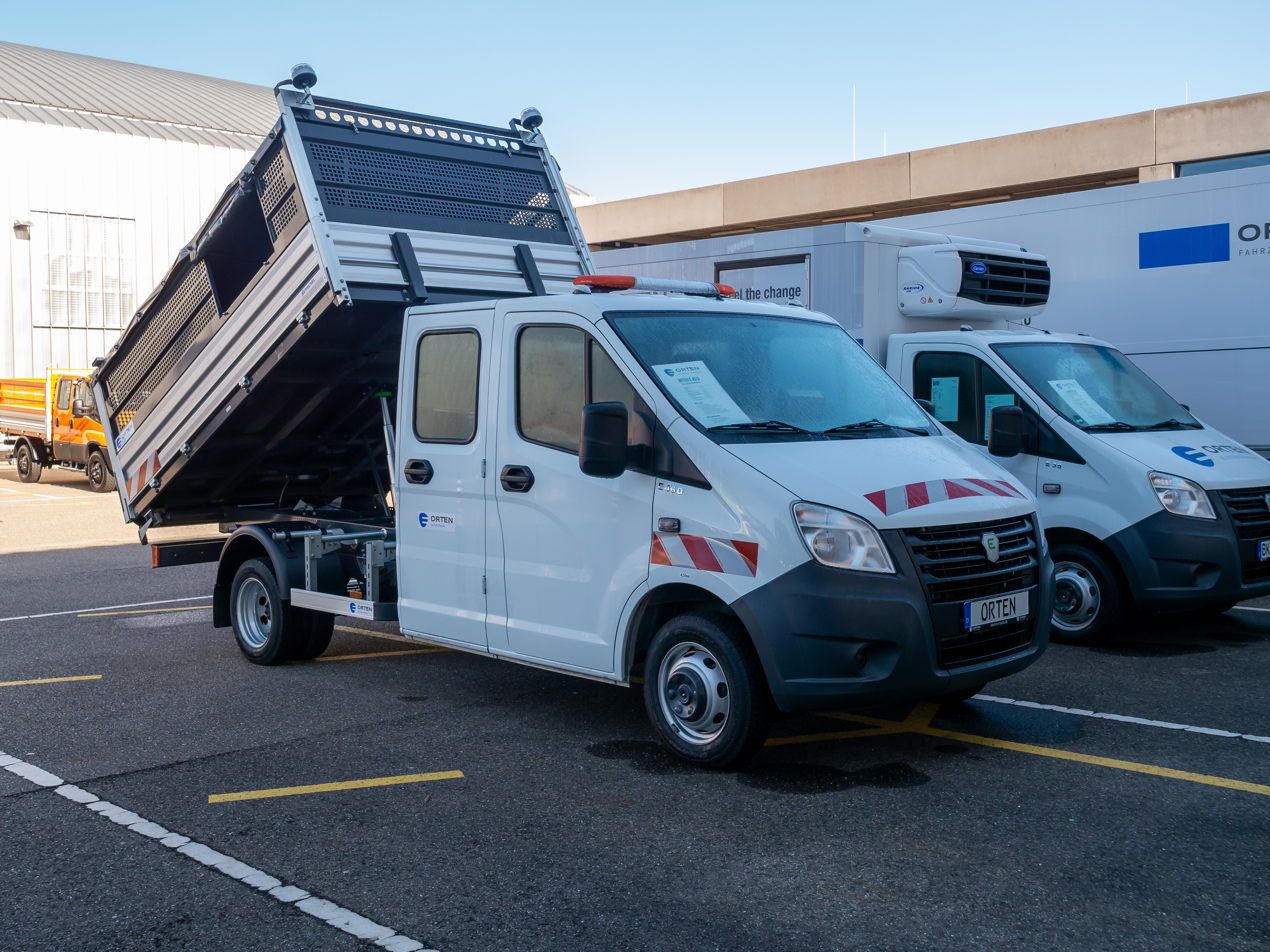
Battery-electric conversion Orten E46 D from Germany

== See also ==
- GAZelle - the original mid-sized trucks, vans and buses made by Russian car manufacturer GAZ.
