= LDV Maxus =

Light commercial van model

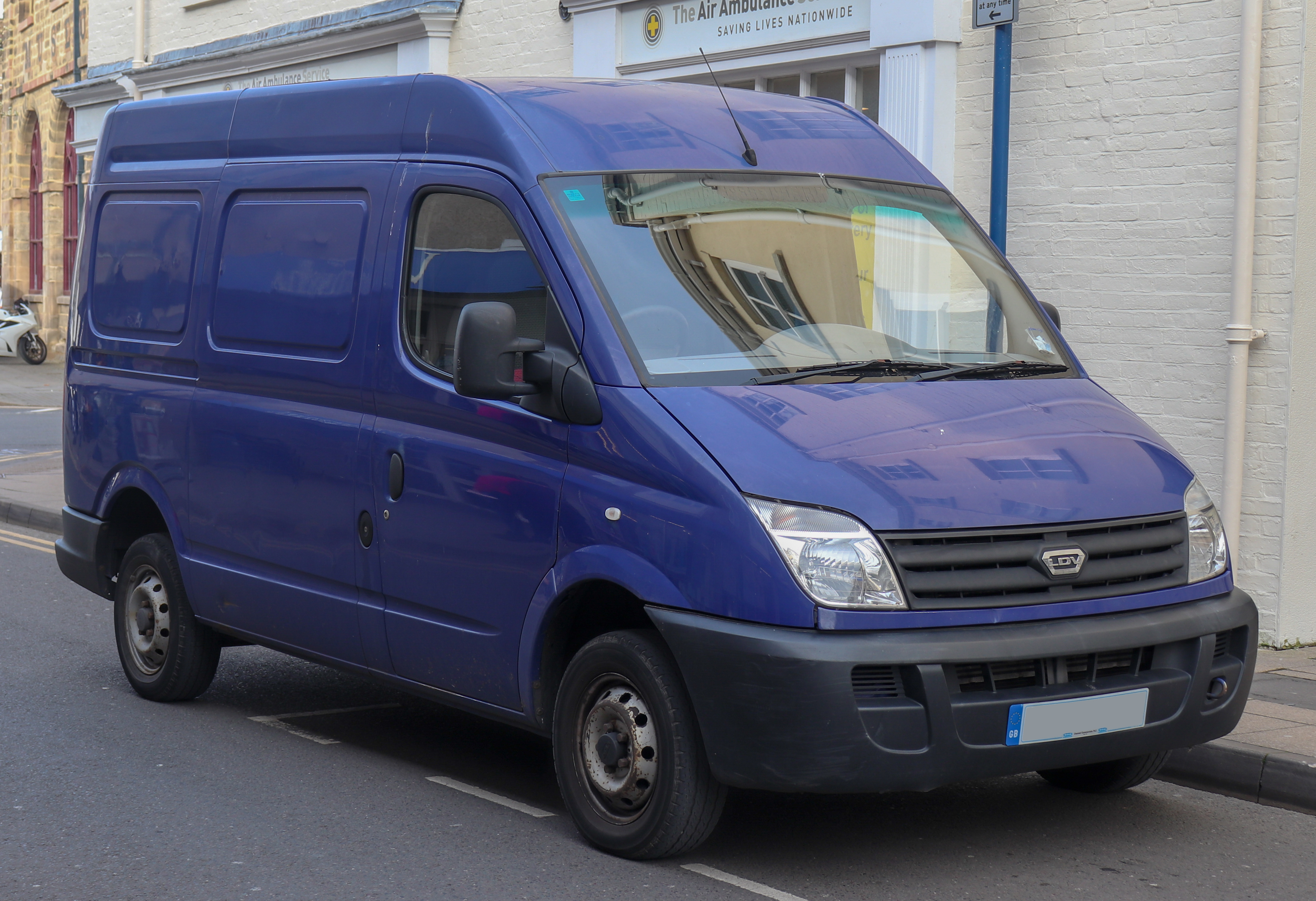

Overview
- Manufacturer: LDV Limited; SAIC Motor
- Also called: LDV V80 (Australia); Maxus V80 (China); Maxus LD100 (Russia); Weststar LDV Maxus (Malaysia); MG V80 (Thailand); Fargo Fora (Turkey); TEMSA Maxus (Turkey)
- Production: 2004–2009 (LDV); 2011–present (SAIC)
- Assembly: United Kingdom: Birmingham (LDV); China: Wuxi, Jiangsu (SAIC); Turkey: Gebze (Askam Otomotiv, until 2015); Russia: Nizhny Novgorod (GAZ); Malaysia: Pekan (HICOM); Thailand: Laem Chabang (SAIC-CP)

Body and chassis
- Class: Light commercial vehicle (M)
- Body style: Van; Minibus; Chassis cab
- Layout: Front-engine, Front wheel drive

Powertrain
- Engine: 2.5 L VM R425 DOHC diesel I4
- Electric motor: Fuel cell-powered 115 kW (156 PS), 350 N⋅m (258 lb⋅ft) (FCV80)
- Transmission: 5 speed manual 5-speed automated manual 6-speed manual 6-speed automated manual 6-speed automatic 1-speed fixed gear ratio (FCV80)
- Battery: 14.3 kWh Lithium-ion phosphate (FCV80)
- Range: 305 km (190 mi) (FCV80)

Dimensions
- Wheelbase: 3,100–3,850 mm (122.0–151.6 in)
- Length: 4,920–5,700 mm (193.7–224.4 in)
- Width: 1,998 mm (78.7 in)
- Height: 2,345–2,552 mm (92.3–100.5 in)
- Curb weight: 2,061–2,380 kg (4,544–5,247 lb)

Chronology
- Predecessor: LDV Pilot; LDV Convoy; LDV Cub; FSC Lublin (indirect)
- Successor: Maxus V90 (China)

The LDV Maxus is a light commercial van model, originally produced by LDV Limited. It was launched at the end of 2004. The model was jointly developed under the LD100 programme code by LDV and Daewoo Motor, prior to Daewoo entering receivership in November 2000, in a five year, £500 million development programme. It was intended to replace LDV's Convoy model, and Daewoo Motor Polska's Lublin II model. A narrower derivative sharing the bodysides of the SWB low-roof versions was partially developed under the BD100 codename to replace LDV's Pilot model, but this never reached production.

Following General Motors' acquisition of Daewoo, LDV secured the exclusive rights to the vehicle, purchased the tooling, and moved it from Daewoo's plant in Lublin, Poland to the LDV site in Washwood Heath, Birmingham. A version of the Maxus was also manufactured by GAZ in Russia.

In March 2011, the Chinese company SAIC Motor launched a new commercial vehicle marque called Maxus, following its acquisition of the intellectual property of LDV in 2010. The LDV Maxus model was relaunched by SAIC as the V80 in June 2011.

== History ==
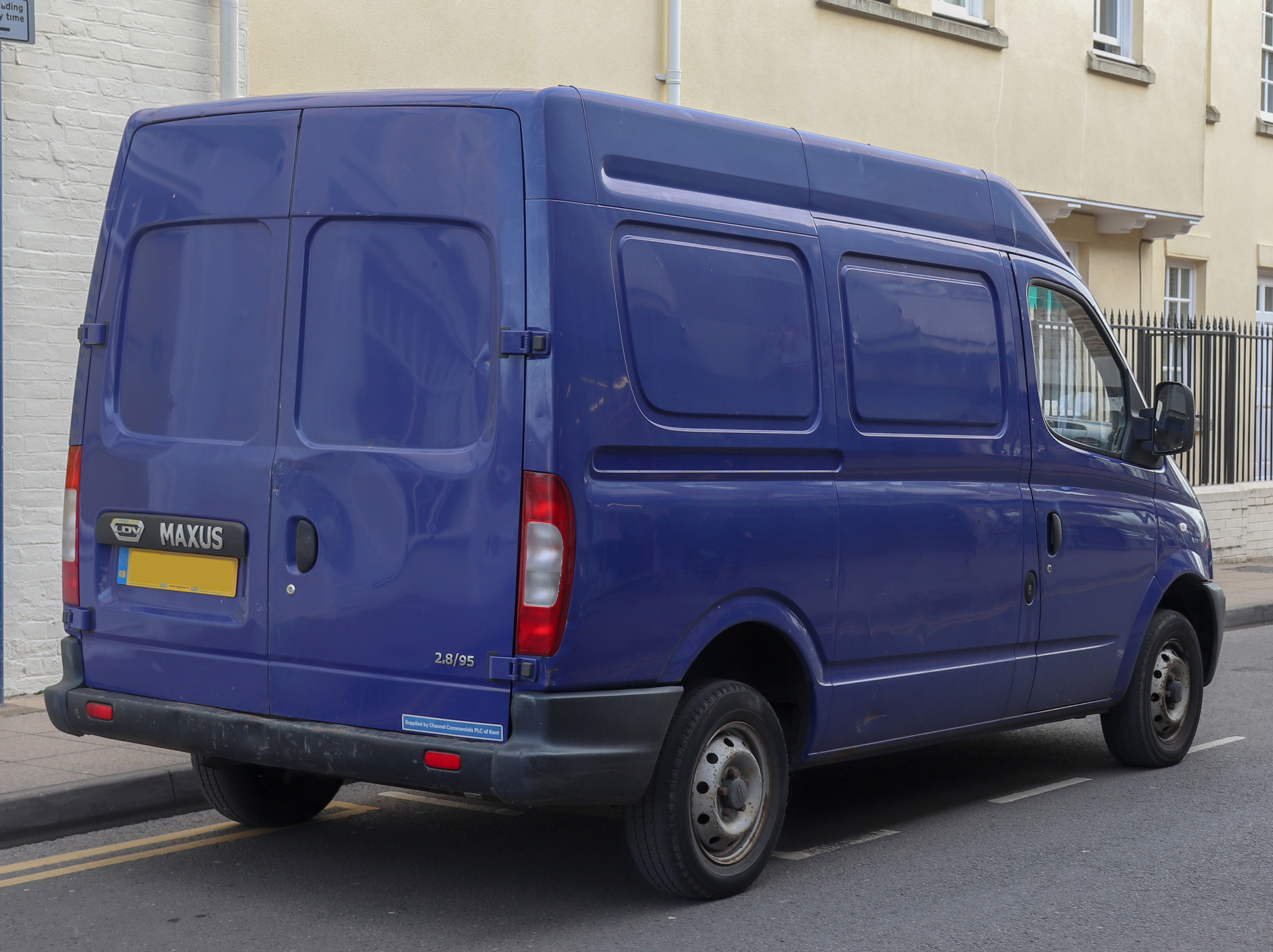
LDV Maxus 2.8T

Since its launch, the Maxus received good reviews and sold well across the United Kingdom. The van was used on the fleet basis by companies, such as National Grid, Royal Mail, and various services of the British Police.

Not long after its launch, the LDV Maxus was awarded the Professional Van and Light Truck Magazine "Van of the Year 2005", and has since won several further awards including "Van of the Year", "Minibus of the Year" and "Combi of the Year".

LDV was acquired in July 2006 by the Russian automotive giant GAZ, that had plans to start production of the Maxus in one of its Russian factories by 2010, but the LDV factory went into administration in June 2009, due to lack of funds from Russian owner GAZ.

About 800 workers were laid off during this period, leaving the whole van building operation in question. It had been hoped that the Malaysian company Weststar LDV, which distributed the Maxus under licence in Asia, Europe and the Middle East, would acquire LDV, but the deal fell through the week before LDV entered administration.

In 2008, LDV manufactured 10,000 vans, generating sales of about £150 million, but lost £54 million in 2008 and the first quarter of 2009, before the failure of the company.

In August 2010, China's SAIC, which bought most of the LDV assets, planned to launch the Chinese version of Maxus in 2011, and in April 2011 announced the Maxus would be called the Datong (meaning big wisdom and smooth in Chinese) under its new Maxus brand.

The Maxus was available in two wheelbases, three roof heights, and a choice of 2.8t, 3.2t, and 3.5t GVW. The vehicle was also available in these roles:

- Multi-purpose role, mixing seats and space for the transport of goods
- Minibus (passenger van) version providing 10, 12, 15 or 17 seats
- Chassis cab version with dropside, tipper, luton and box vans

== Maxus V80 ==
Available from the summer of 2011, the Chinese built V80, marketed under the new Maxus marque, is available in three versions: standard, logistics, and deluxe. The Minibus is available from 7 to 16 seaters, in two trim levels. The choice of two wheelbases remains, with two different versions of the 2.5-litre diesel engine producing 88 kW (118 hp) or 100 kW (134 hp).

Colour choices include crystal violet, olive-brown and aurora silver for deluxe variants, blanc white, aurora silver and lava grey for standard and the logistics variant only with blanc white. The Maxus V80 is exported to English speaking countries under the LDV brand. Australia and New Zealand were the first to receive exports in 2012. The Maxus V80 has also been sold as the Pyeonghwa Changjeon 1610 in North Korea.

Since 2013, the Maxus V80 was exported to Thailand, in May 2014, to Colombia, in May 2015, to Ireland, and in 2016, to the United Kingdom.

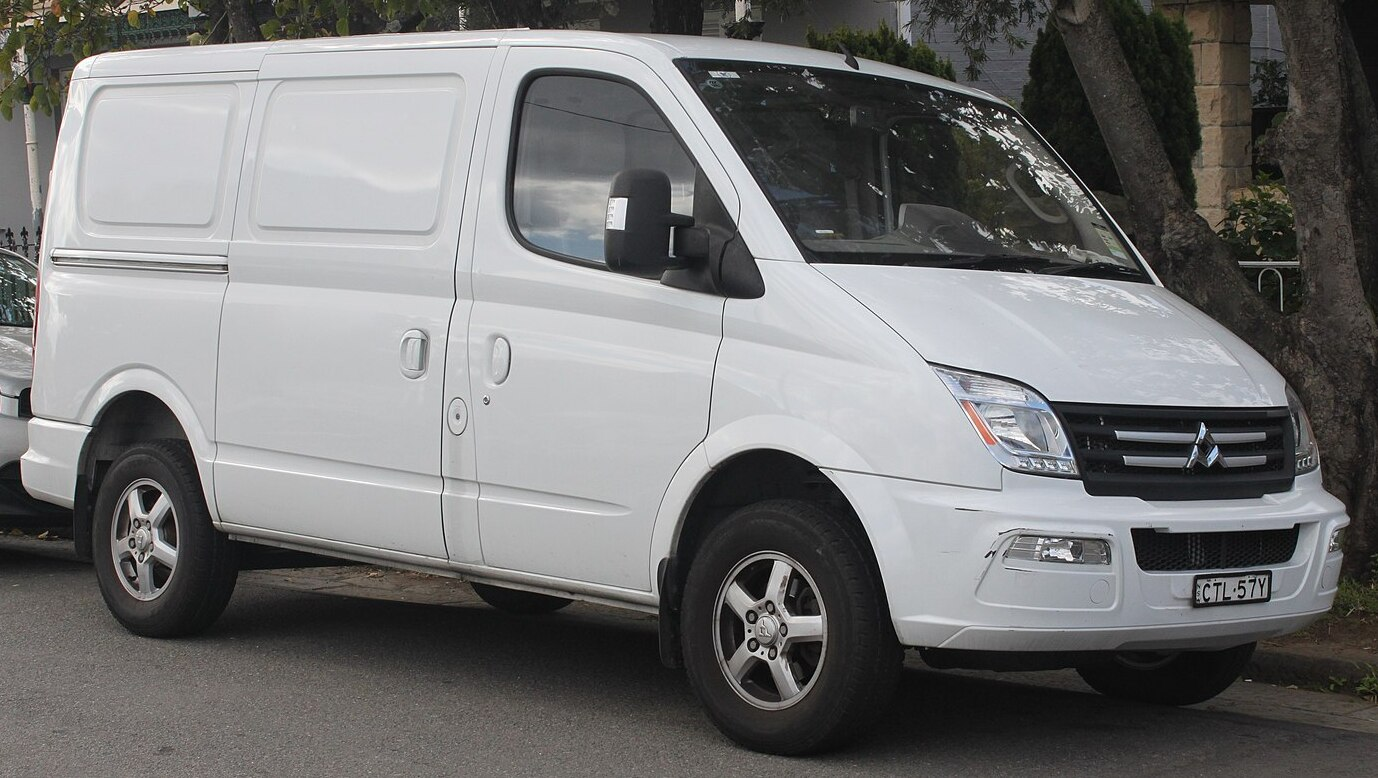
Maxus V80 Short WheelBase (SWB)

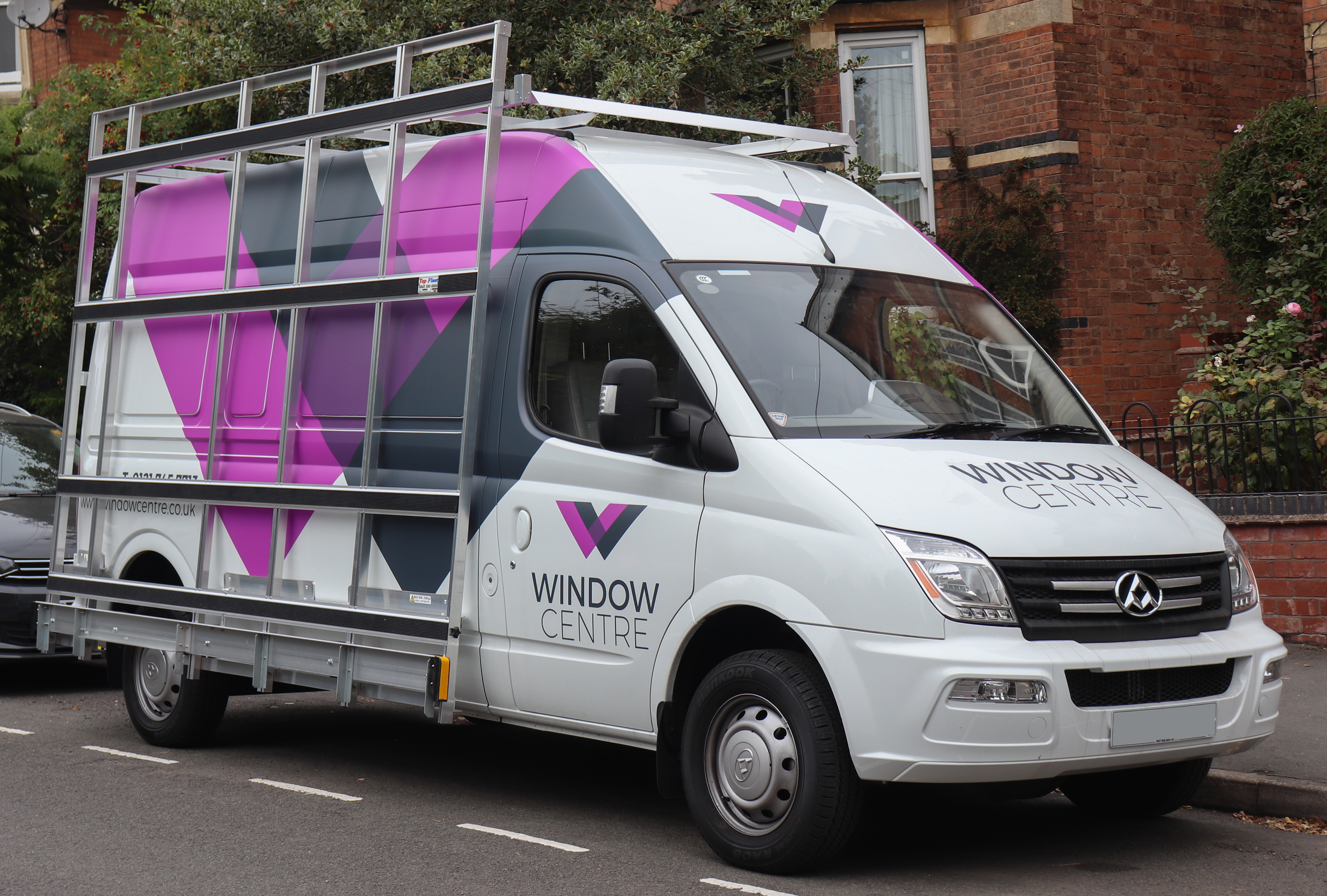
Maxus V80 Long WheelBase (LWB)

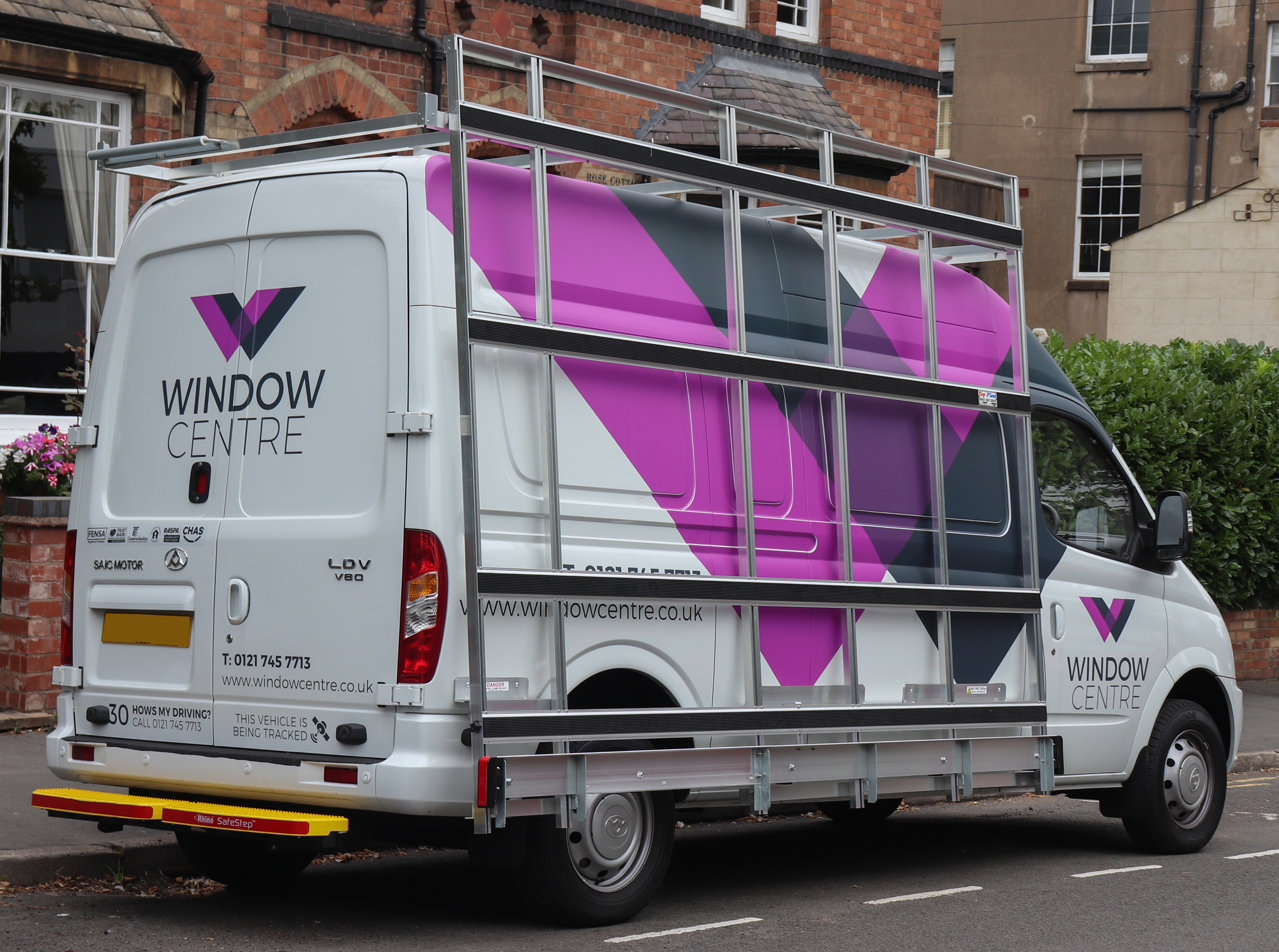
Maxus V80 LWB

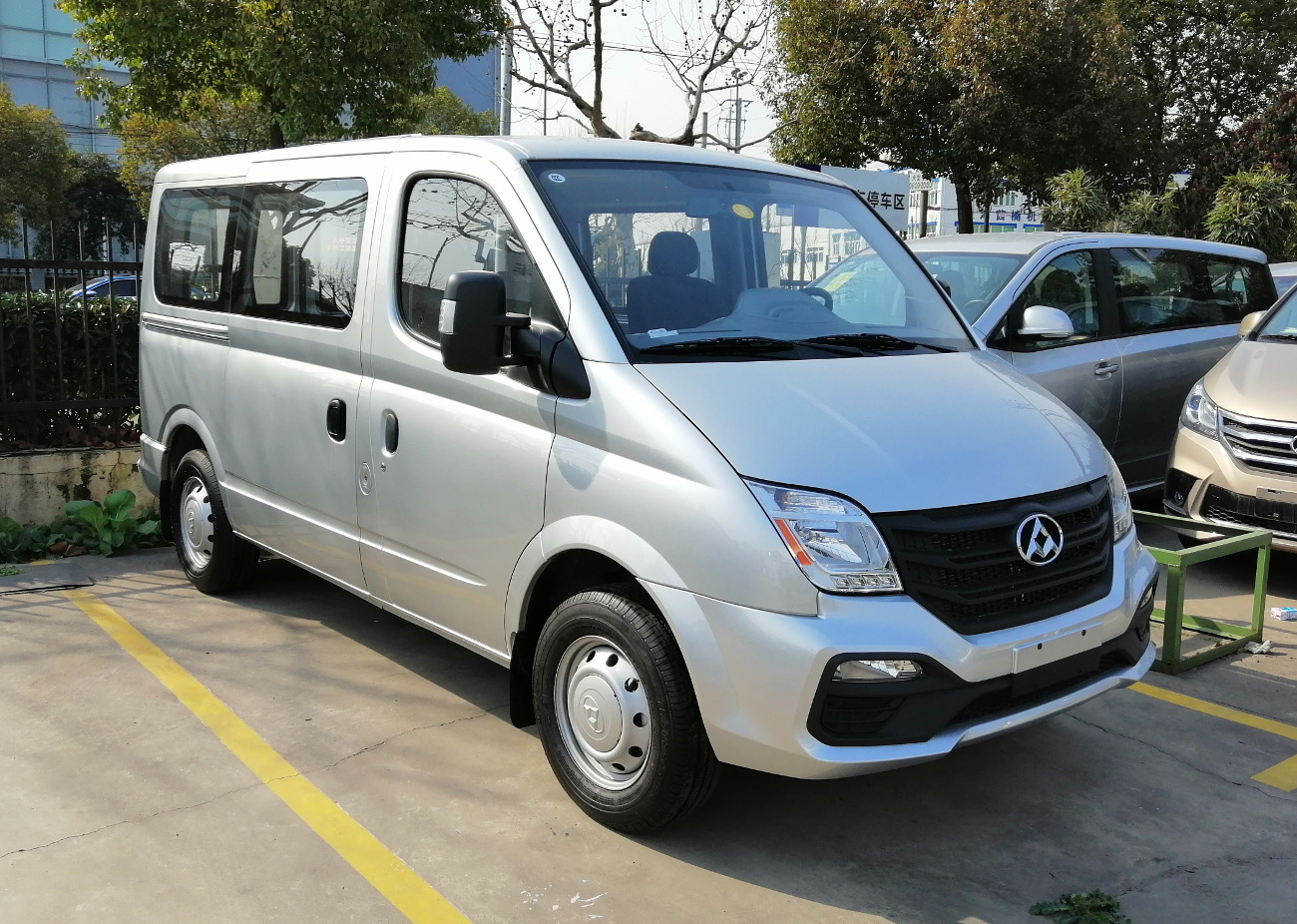
Maxus V80 SWB facelift

In November 2023, the Maxus V80 received a massive update for the 2024 model year in the Chinese domestic market. The V80 facelift was named the Xintu V80 (新途 V80), listing the post facelift model under a series of Xintu vans.

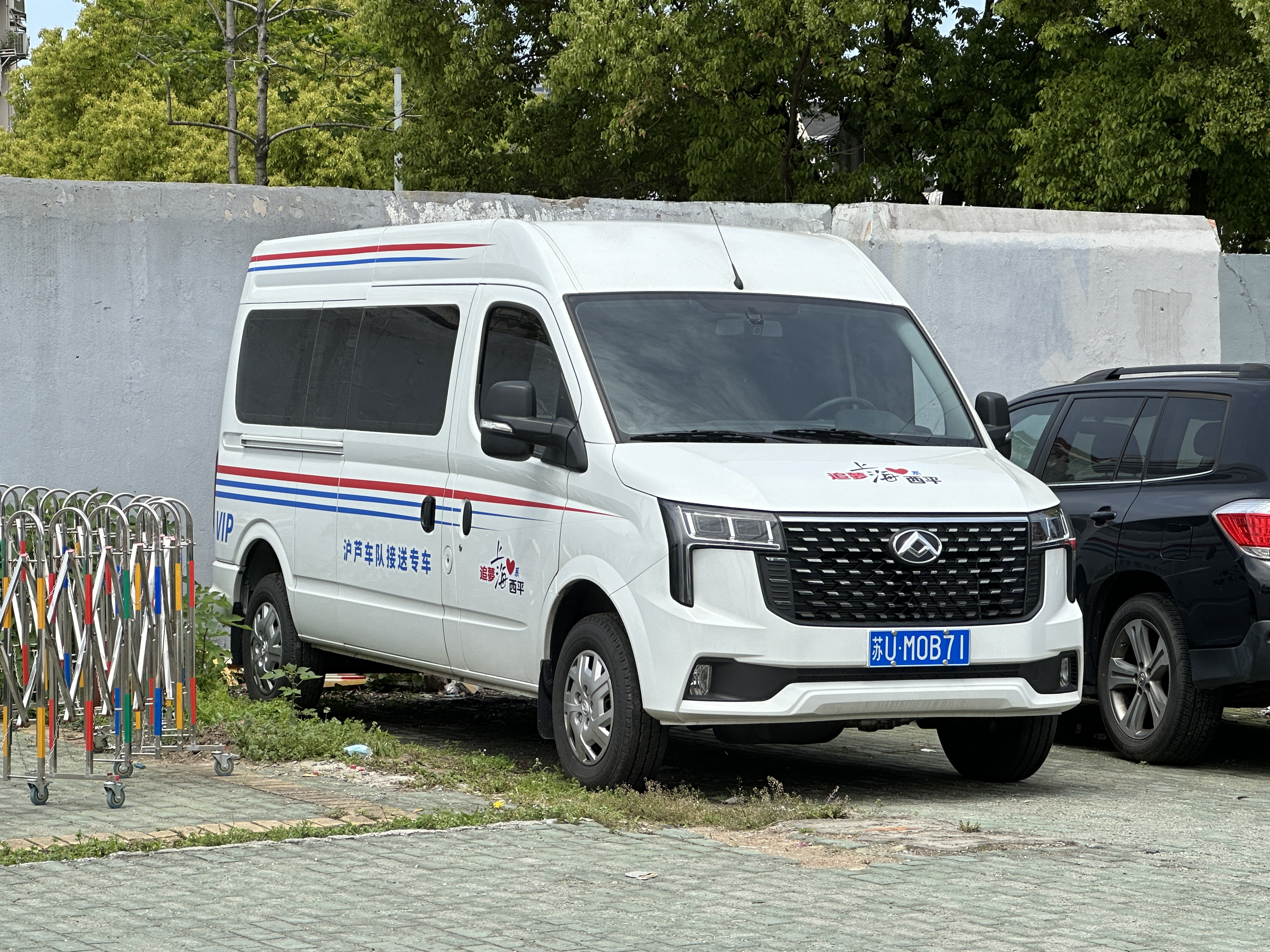
Maxus Xintu V80 (SWB)

=== Maxus FCV80 ===
A plug-in hybrid fuel cell version of the V80 the FCV80 a light passenger was launched in November 2017 at the Guangzhou International Automobile Exhibition. The FCV80 has an electric motor that delivers 100 kilowatts (130 hp) and 350 N⋅m (260 lbf⋅ft) of torque. It has a 14.3 kWh Lithium-Ion battery that can be charged (plug-in AC) in four hours. It has a maximum speed of 100 km/h (62 mph), two 100L hydrogen tanks that can be refueled in 3 minutes, a driving range of 305 kilometres (190 mi) and a range of 500 kilometres (310 mi) at 40 km/h (25 mph). The FCV80 can seat 10 to 14 passengers. In 2020, the FCV80 had recorded sales of 297 vehicles.

=== Maxus EV80 and EV80 Pro ===
The Maxus EV80 and EV80 Plus are electric versions of the V80, and was introduced to the Chinese market in August 2020 alongside the EV90 electric van. The EV80 is powered by a permanent-magnet synchronous motor developing 120kW and 280N·m. The batteries are 51.5, 53, and 71kWh Lithium iron phosphate batteries supporting a pure electric range from 202 to 250km.

Launched in 2023, the Maxus EV80 Pro is a more premium and updated variant of the regular EV80. Following the 2024 model year of the ICE powered V80, the vehicle is massively restyled with a completely different front end and new tail lamps. The EV80 is powered by the same permanent-magnet synchronous motor developing 120 kW (161 hp) and 280 N⋅m (207 lb⋅ft) from the EV80 Plus. The EV80 Pro is equipped with 77kWh Lithium iron phosphate batteries, and only takes 43 minutes to charge to 80%. The official range unveiled by Maxus is 320km.

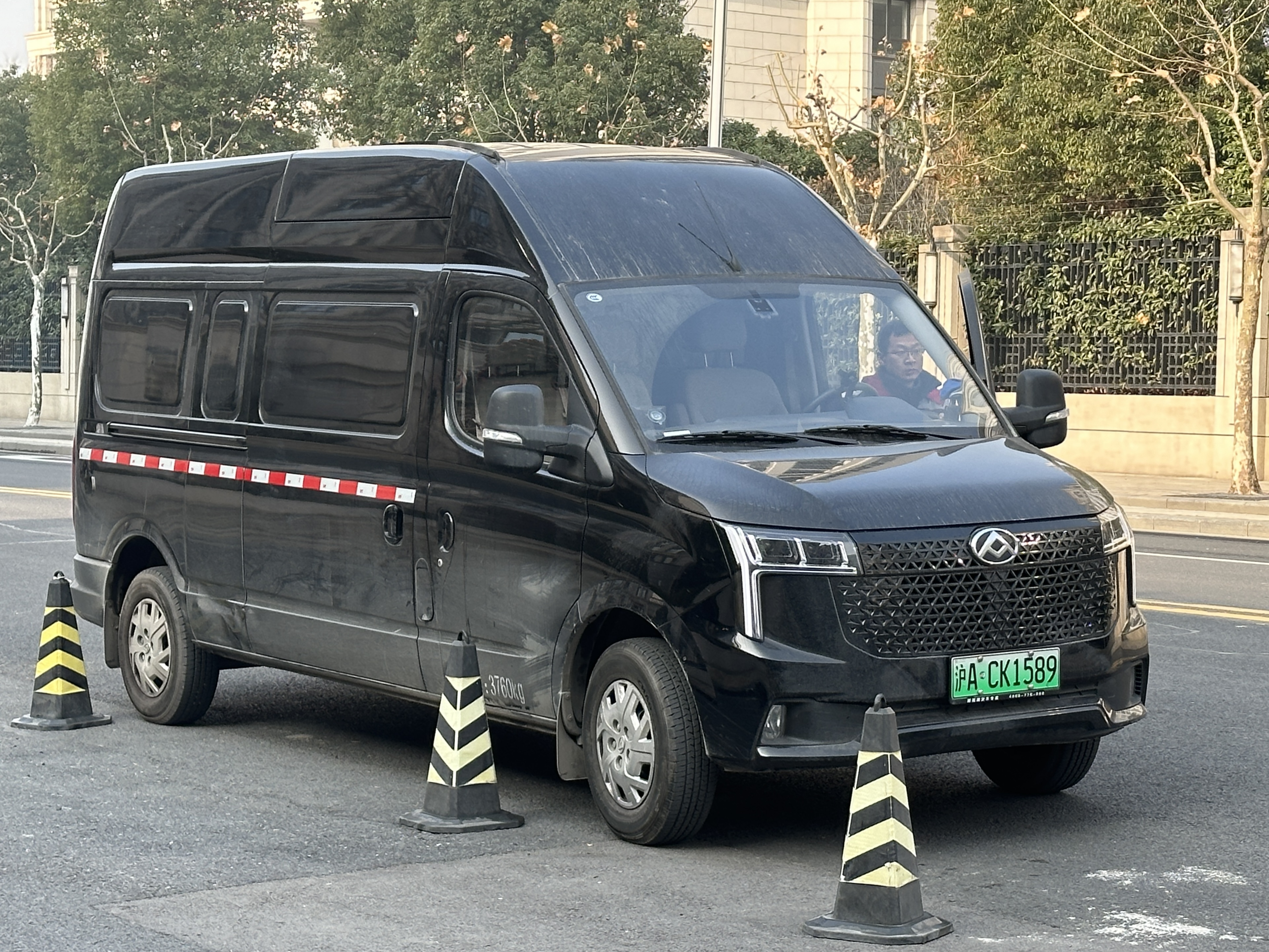
Maxus EV80 Pro

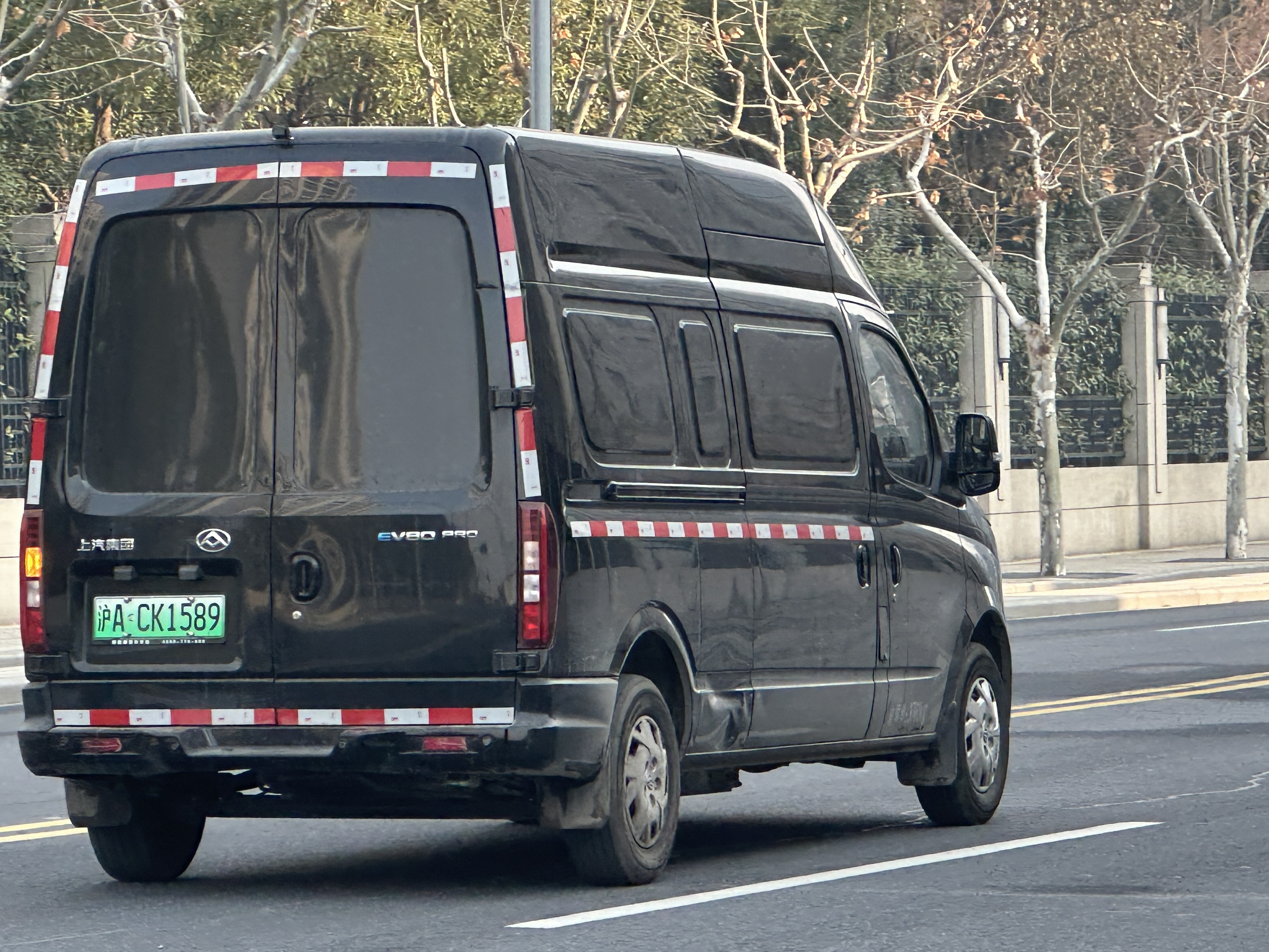
Maxus EV80 Pro (rear)

== MG V80 ==
The V80 is marketed as the MG V80 in Thailand since March 2019. The Thai-spec V80 is powered by a 2.5-litre diesel-turbo sourced from VM Motori. Outputs are rated at 100 kW (136 PS) and 330 N⋅m (243 lb⋅ft). There are two transmission types to choose from: six-speed manual; or single-clutch automatic (automated manual).

== Safety ==
ANCAP test results LDV V80 short wheelbase, low roof variants without ESC (2013)
Test	Score
Overall	2 /5 stars
Frontal offset	4.97/16
Side impact	16/16
Pole	Not Assessed
Seat belt reminders	0/3
Whiplash protection	Not Assessed
Pedestrian protection	Not Assessed
Electronic stability control	Not Available

ANCAP test results LDV V80 short wheelbase, low roof variants with ESC (2013)
Test	Score
Overall	3 /5 stars
Frontal offset	4.97/16
Side impact	16/16
Pole	Not Assessed
Seat belt reminders	0/3
Whiplash protection	Not Assessed
Pedestrian protection	Standard
Electronic stability control	Not Available
