= Tata Winger =

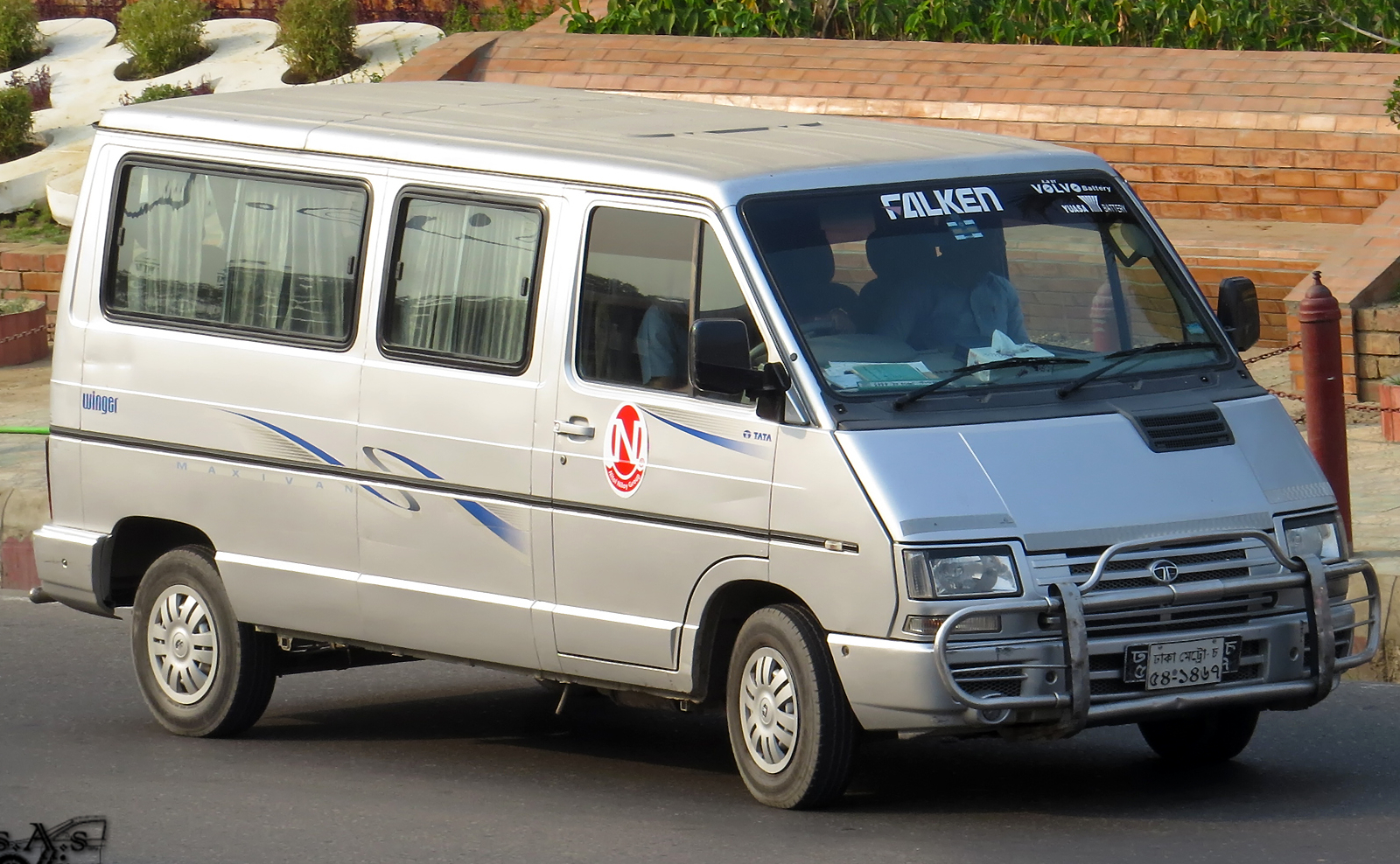

Overview
- Manufacturer: Tata Motors
- Production: 2007–present

Body and chassis
- Class: Light commercial vehicle
- Body style: Van
- Layout: Longitudinal front-engine, front-wheel drive
- Related: Renault Trafic; Winnebago LeSharo

Powertrain
- Engine: 1.95 L 483DLTC diesel I4; 2.2 L DW12 DICOR BS VI diesel I4
- Transmission: 5-speed Manual; 4-speed automatic

Dimensions
- Wheelbase: 2,800 mm (110.2 in); 3,200 mm (126.0 in); 3,488 mm (137.3 in)
- Length: 4,540 mm (178.7 in); 4,940 mm (194.5 in); 5,548 mm (218.4 in)
- Width: 1,905 mm (75.0 in)
- Height: 2,050 mm (80.7 in)
- Kerb weight: 1,620 kg (3,571 lb); 1,720 kg (3,792 lb); 1,740 kg (3,836 lb)

The Tata Winger is a light commercial van produced by the Indian automaker Tata Motors since 2007. It is a rebadged version of the Renault Trafic Mk1 Phase 3 van, but fitted with Tata's own diesel four-cylinder engines.

== First Generation (2007–2019) ==
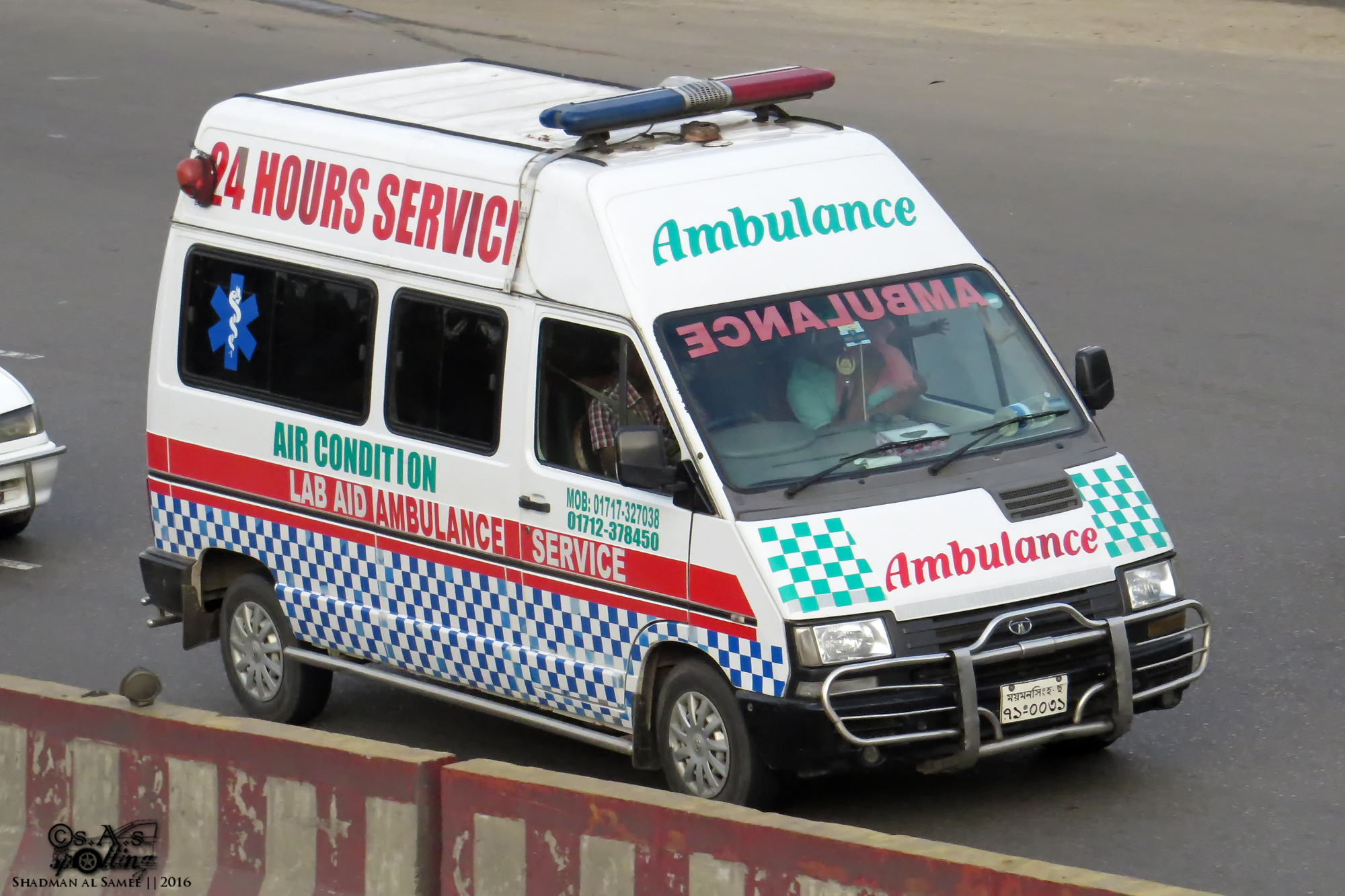
Tata Winger used as an ambulance (Bangladesh)

The Winger was launched in June 2007. It was offered in six variants and two seating configurations: long or short wheelbase, high and low roof versions and also specialised ambulance and school bus versions, as well as the plain panel van. The top of the range is a flat roof, the air-conditioned variant is a ten-seater, while the remaining five versions are offered as either 13- or 14-seaters, taking the total number of variants to eleven.

The Winger is powered by a modified version of the 2.0-litre diesel engine that was offered on the Tata Sumo. The 1948 cc engine came with a turbo-charged, inter-cooled (TCIC) version in all the variants, except in the smaller length, entry-level Winger van.

The non-turbo-charged version of the engine develops a peak power of 68 PS (50 kW) compared to the 90 PS (66 kW) that the TCIC version puts out. The Winger meets Bharat Stage VI emission standards. The ambulance model was certified to meet BS-IV standards.

== Second Generation (2020–present) ==
The Second generation Tata Winger was launched in February 2020. It is offered with three wheelbases (2800, 3200, and 3488 mm), two roof heights and four use cases. Both air-conditioned and non-air-conditioned variants are available. Seating capacities range from 9 to 20. Winger is powered by a BS-VI (Euro 6) compliant 2.2-litre turbo diesel engine producing 99 PS (73 kW) and 200 N-m of torque. It uses a semi-hydraulic actuated dry clutch.

== Transmission and suspension ==
The Winger van is front-wheel-drive with a longitudinally mounted engine, coupled to a five-speed transmission. The Winger's suspension is MacPherson strut up front with a beam axle with parabolic leaf springs at the rear.
