= Light commercial vehicle =

Class of commercial carrier vehicle

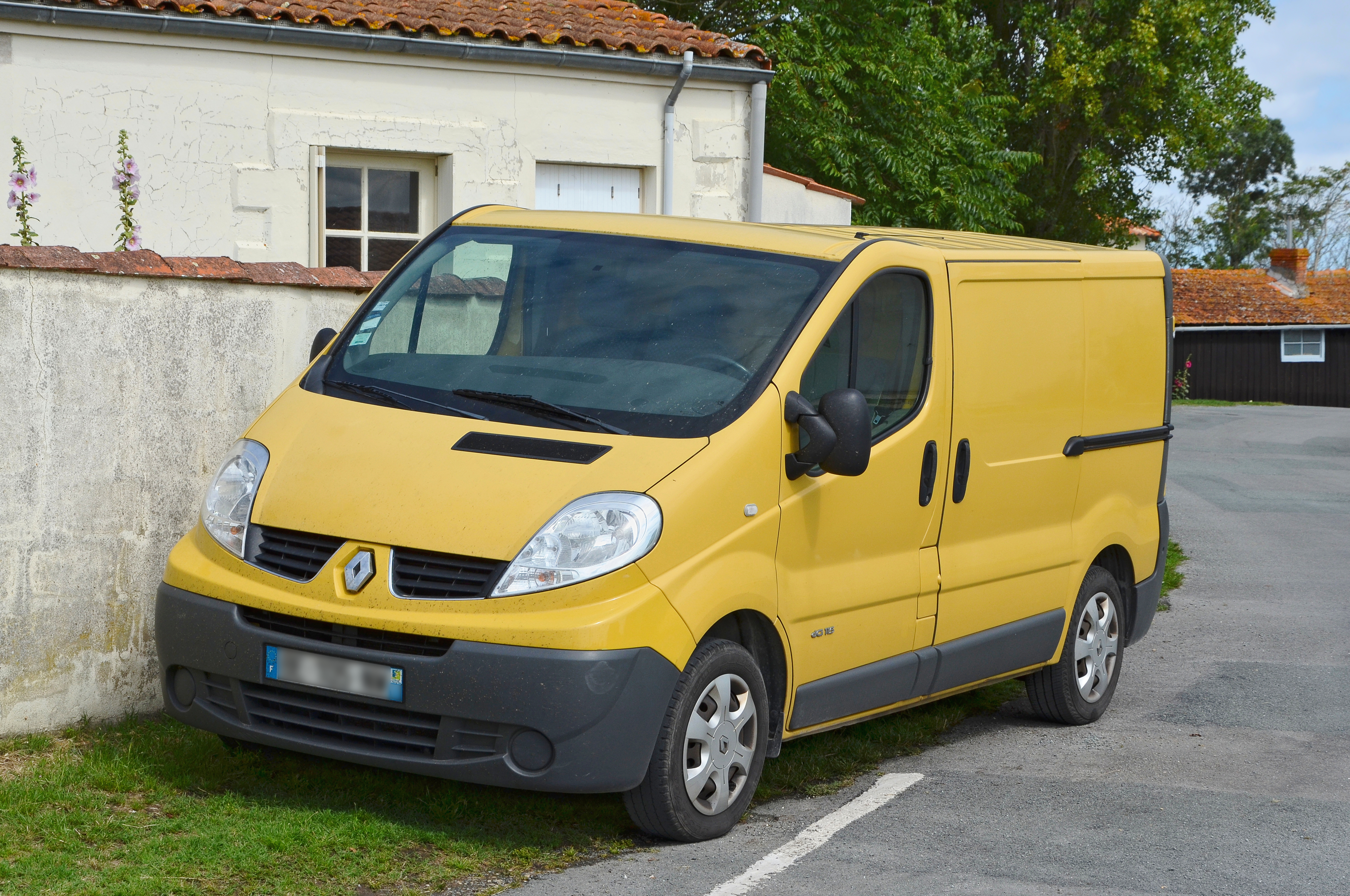
2006 Renault Trafic, also rebadged as Opel/Vauxhall

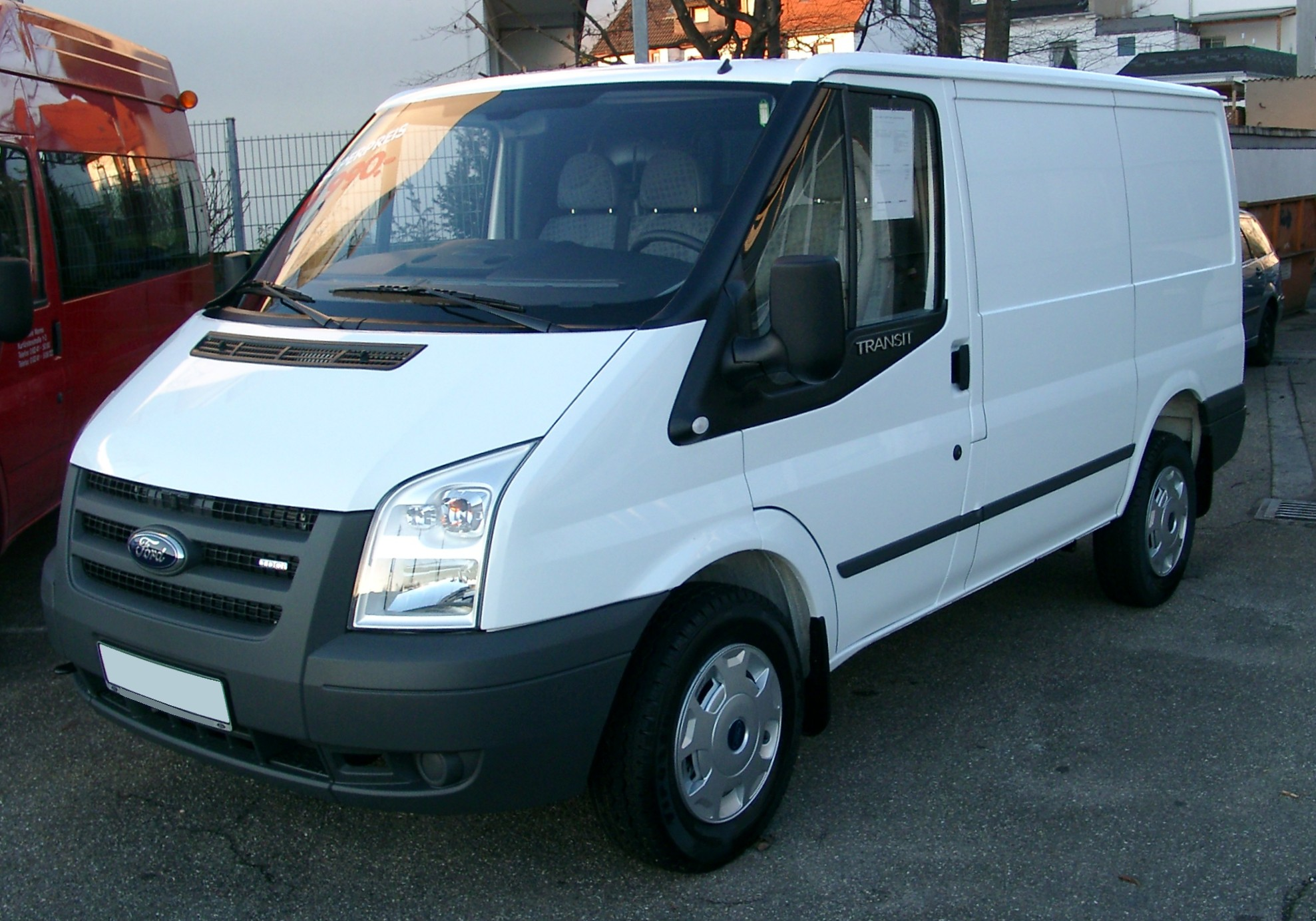
2007 Ford Transit

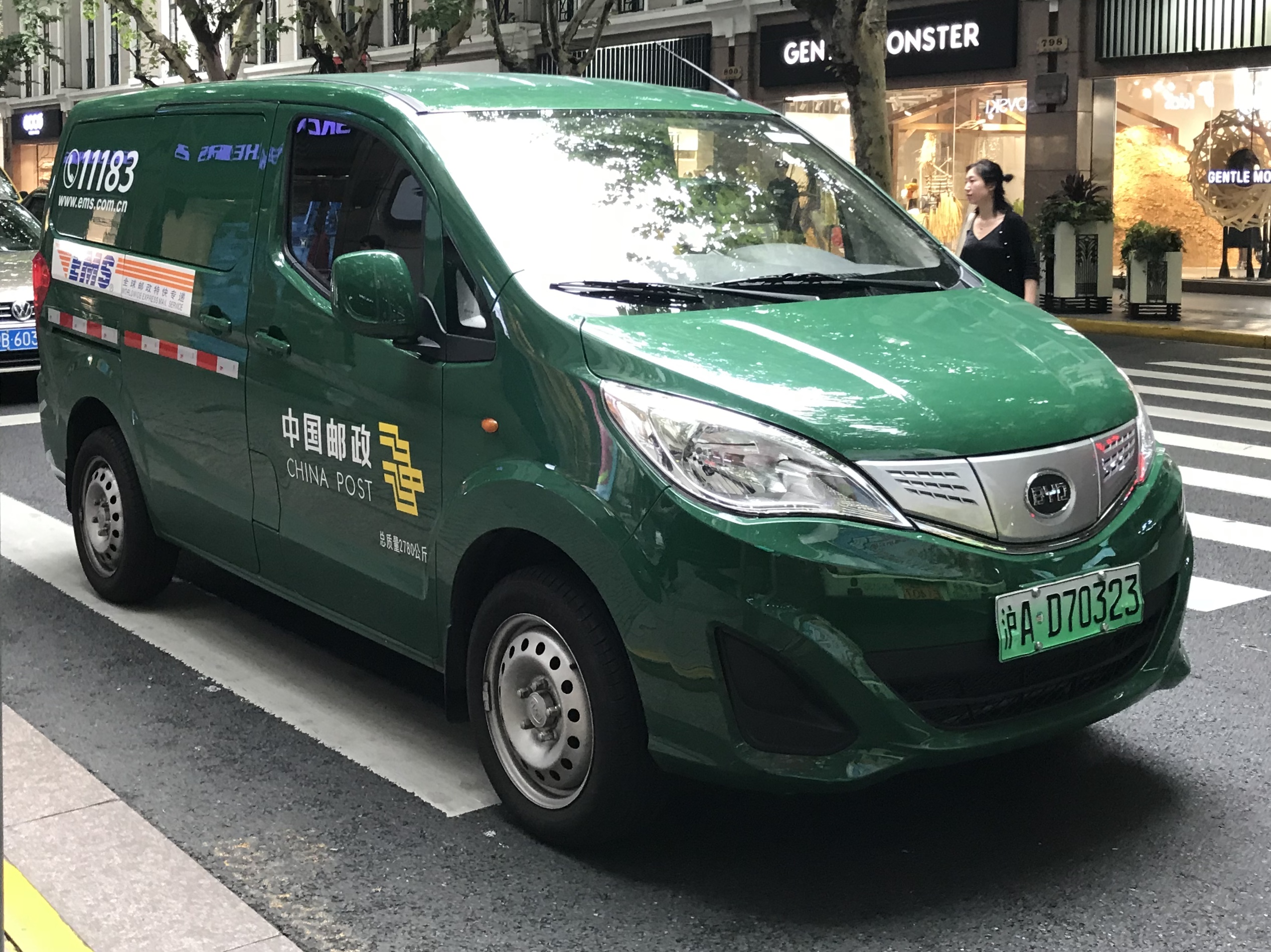
BYD T3

A light commercial vehicle (LCV) in the European Union is a commercial vehicle with a gross vehicle weight of no more than 3.5 metric tons (tonnes) or no more than 4.5 tonnes in Australia and New Zealand. The LCV designation is also occasionally used in both Canada and Ireland (where the term commercial van is more commonly used).

In the UK, light haulage is a restricted-weight delivery service where the maximum permitted gross vehicle weight rating without the need of an operator's license is also up to 3.5 tonnes. Usually light haulage excludes a distribution center as most deliveries are direct. A delivery may consist of a single, multiple or priority urgent load and can be either same-day or next-day delivery. The vehicle (as long as its gross vehicle weight doesn't exceed the 3.5 t limit) does not require a tachograph and can also be driven by people with a regular car license without the need for an operator's license. The speed restriction is higher than for heavy goods vehicles: 60 mph (97 km/h) on dual carriageways and up to 70 mph (113 km/h) on motorways.

Qualifying light commercial vehicles include pickup trucks, vans and three-wheelers – all commercial goods or passenger-carrying vehicles. The LCV concept was created as a compact truck and is usually optimised to be tough-built, have low operating costs and powerful yet fuel-efficient engines, and to be used in intra-city operations.

== Examples ==
- BYD
  - BYD M3 DM
  - BYD T3
  - BYD Shang
- Citroën
  - Jumper
  - Jumpy
  - Berlingo
  - Nemo
- Dacia
  - Dokker
- Daihatsu
  - Gran Max
  - Hijet
- Fiat
  - Ducato
  - Doblò
  - Scudo
  - Fiorino
- Ford
  - Econovan
  - Transit
  - Transit Connect
  - Transit Courier
  - Transit Custom
- GAZ
  - Sobol
  - GAZelle
  - GAZelle NEXT
- Iveco
  - Daily
- Hyundai
  - Grace
  - Starex
  - Staria
  - iLoad
  - iMax
  - H350
  - Porter
- Maxus
  - V80
  - V90
- Mazda
  - Bongo
  - E-series
- Mercedes-Benz
  - Sprinter
  - Vito
  - Citan
- Mini
  - Clubvan
- Nissan
  - NV200
  - NV250
  - NV300
  - Cabstar
  - NV400
  - NV350 Caravan
- Mitsubishi
  - Delica
  - L300
  - L200
- Opel
  - Vivaro
  - Movano A/B
  - Movano C
  - Combo
- Peugeot
  - Boxer
  - Partner
  - Rifter
  - Expert
  - Bipper
- Piaggio
  - Ape
  - Porter
- Renault
  - Trafic
  - Master
  - Maxity
  - Kangoo
- Škoda
  - Praktik
- Tata Motors
  - Ace
  - Winger
  - Yodha
- Toyota
  - HiAce
  - LiteAce
  - ProAce
  - TownAce
- Volkswagen
  - Caddy
  - Transporter
  - Crafter
  - LT

== Sales channels ==
Light commercial vehicles are sold through dealer networks. Usually, a car dealer will have a franchise for the sale of a manufacturer's cars and the LCVs will be sold as an addition. The exceptions to these are Mercedes-Benz, which has a dedicated commercial vehicle network for heavy and light commercial vehicles, Volkswagen, whose franchised dealers usually have standalone van centres, Iveco, and Isuzu Truck. Isuzu Truck market commercial vehicles up to 18 tonnes GVW and Iveco market their heavy truck range with their Daily van to complement this.

Many franchised dealers also retail used LCVs, with the poorer quality examples sent to specialist auctions for sale. There is a large network of independent used commercial vehicle retailers who retail thousands of used commercial vehicles every month. LCV dealers are increasingly using the Internet to help sell their vehicles in addition to the traditional print media.

== See also ==
- Enhanced environmentally friendly vehicle
- Truck classification
- Light truck
- Criticism of SUVs
