= Standard car =

Standard car may refer to:

- A mid-size car or full-size car, or a vehicle size class in between those two
- A car with manual transmission
- A car manufactured by the Standard Motor Company
