= Standard Flying Sixteen/Twenty =

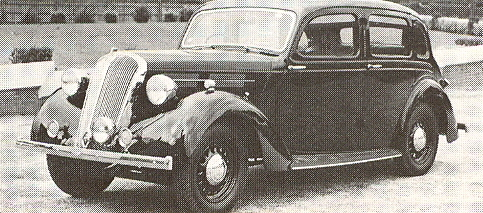
- 1939 Standard Flying Twenty

Overview
- Manufacturer: Standard Motor Company
- Production: 1935–1937 (Sixteen); 1935–1939 (Twenty)
- Assembly: United Kingdom

Body and chassis
- Body style: 4-door 5-seat (fastback) saloon; 4-door 5-seat Touring Saloon (Avon)
- Layout: FR
- Related: Standard Flying Fourteen; SS 1

Powertrain
- Engine: 2,143 cc Sixteen sv I6; 2,663 cc Twenty sv I6
- Transmission: 4-speed manual

Dimensions
- Wheelbase: 116 in (2,946 mm) (Sixteen); 117 in (2,972 mm) (Twenty); 123 in (3,124 mm) (Twenty); Track: 52 in (1,320 mm)
- Length: Twenty SWB: 180 in (4,570 mm)
- Width: 63 in (1,600 mm)
- Kerb weight: 2,884 lb (1,308 kg) (1936)

Chronology
- Predecessor: Standard Sixteen/Twenty

The Standard Flying Sixteen/Flying Twenty is an automobile produced by the British Standard Motor Company from October 1935 to 1939. It, along with most of the other Flying Standard models, were announced in October 1935. A standard is a flag and the reference to flying standards is to flying flags as well as to the airstream design of the cars. The Flying Sixteen was discontinued during 1937 and its place in the lineup taken by the four-cylinder Flying Fourteen.

== Bodies ==
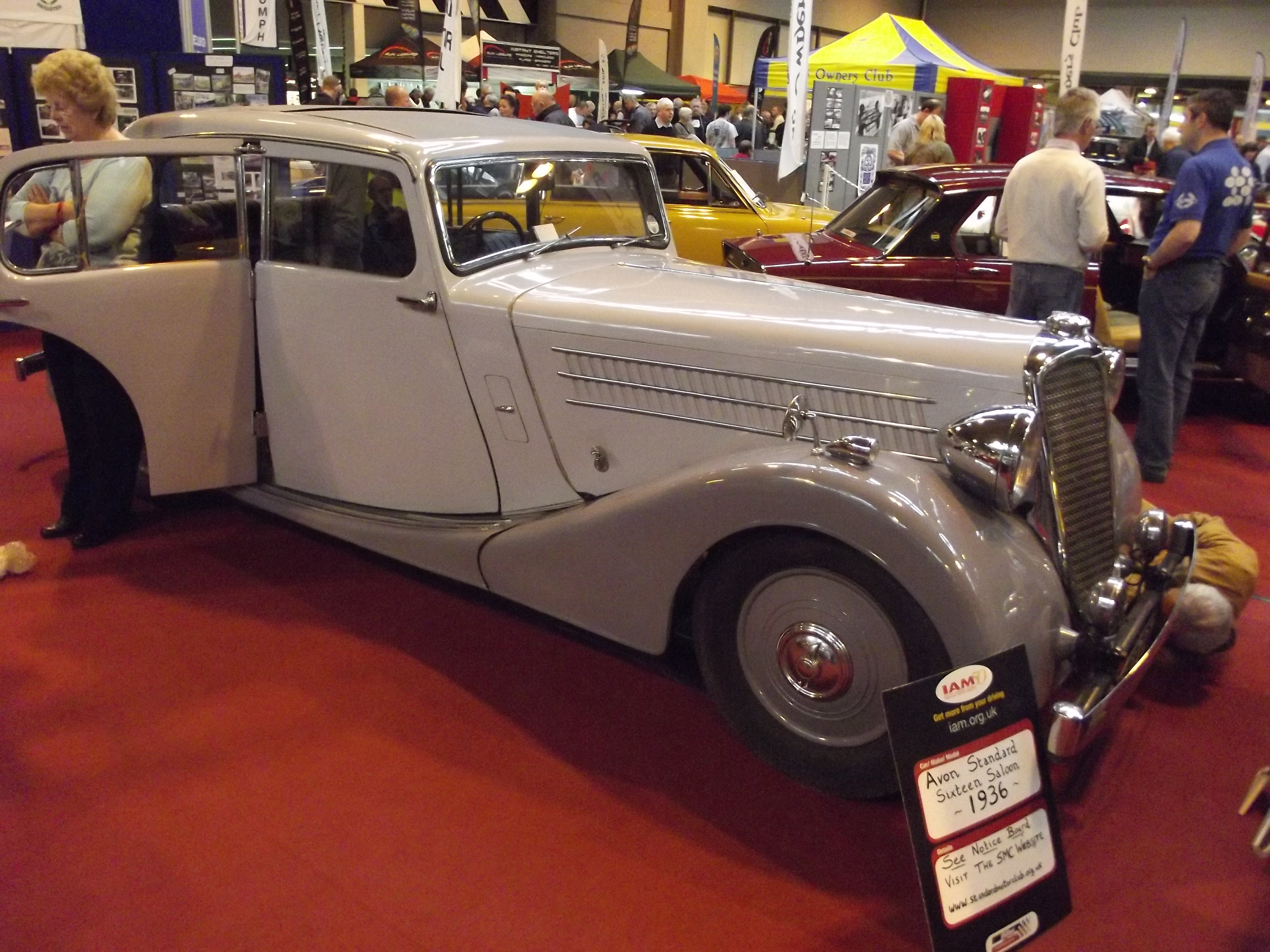
An Avon-bodied Standard Flying Sixteen Saloon (1936)

The Flying Sixteen/Twenty was commonly a four-door, five-seat saloon with a gently tapering body and a split rear windshield, but other designs were also available. The Flying series used streamlined bodywork, with bodywork (from the a-pillar and back) shared between the Flying Twelve, Flying Sixteen, and Flying Twenty. The front end was different, and wheelbases differed to accommodate the various engines. The Sixteen sat on a 116 in (2,950 mm) wheelbase, while Flying Twenty buyers could choose between 117 and 123 in (2,970 and 3,120 mm) wheelbases.

The standard, fastback body was designed under direction of Arthur Ballard and was built by Briggs Motor Bodies. Being of a somewhat bulbous appearance, the design is often called a "beetle-back." In addition to this, coachbuilders Avon also offered their "Waymaker" design - a more rakish, lower slung, four-door touring sedan - until their bankruptcy in late 1937. The conventional shield-shaped radiator casing was replaced by a chromed vertically-barred "fencer's mask" grille late in 1937 for the 1938 model year. This also brought with it a model name change, becoming the Flying Twenty 20A. For the 1939 model year, the "torpedo" (fastback) design was changed to a notchback look, becoming the 20CA in the process. While production reportedly ended in 1939, the Flying Twenty remained in price lists into 1940.

== Technical ==
The large Flying Standards used semi-elliptic leaf springs all around, while the steering box was a bishop cam and lever unit. Unusual for the time was the telescopically adjustable steering wheel. Cable-operated (by hand or foot) Bendix "Duo-Servo" brake system operating cast-iron alloy drum brakes was fitted. The four-speed manual had synchromesh on the top three gears (standard for all of the Flying Standards), transmitting power via a needle-bearing propeller shaft to a half-floating rear axle with a spiral bevel final drive. The different engines and wheelbases all received different final gear ratios, reflecting their intended usage.

The smaller engine produces 56 bhp (42 kW) at 4,000 rpm, while the larger unit has 65 bhp (48 kW) on tap at 3,800 rpm. Claimed top speeds for the regular-bodied versions are 72 and 76 mph (116 and 122 km/h) respectively.

== SS ==
The Sixteen's and Twenty's engine and transmission were used by the SS 1, predecessors to the SS Jaguar 100 and Jaguar Cars. Because of this, nearly all Flying Sixteen and Flying Twentys have been used to create much more valuable SS replicas. There is reportedly only one remaining Flying Sixteen still with the original engine.
