= Standard Flying Fourteen =

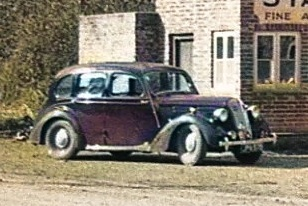
- Standard Flying Fourteen Touring Saloon

Overview
- Manufacturer: Standard Motor Company
- Production: 1937–1940
- Assembly: United Kingdom

Body and chassis
- Body style: 4-door 5-seat (fastback) saloon; 4-door 5-seat Touring Saloon; 2-door drophead coupe
- Layout: FR
- Related: Standard Twelve

Powertrain
- Engine: 1,776 cc (108.4 cu in) Straight-4 side-valve
- Transmission: Four speed manual — synchromesh on 2, 3 and 4; needle-bearing propeller shaft to a half-floating rear axle; spiral bevel final drive

Dimensions
- Wheelbase: 108 in (2,743 mm); ’’’Track’’’ 52 in (1,321 mm)
- Length: 173 in (4,394 mm)
- Width: 62 in (1,575 mm)
- Height: 63 in (1,600 mm)
- Kerb weight: Saloon 24 cwt, 2,688 lb (1,219 kg)

Chronology
- Predecessor: none
- Successor: Standard Fourteen

Standard Fourteen

Overview
- Manufacturer: Standard Motor Company

Layout
- Configuration: Straight 4-cylinder
- Displacement: 1,776 cc (108.4 cu in)
- Cylinder bore: 73 mm (2.87 in)
- Piston stroke: 106 mm (4.17 in)
- Cylinder head material: aluminium detachable
- Valvetrain: side
- Compression ratio: 6.5

Combustion
- Fuel system: Solex carburettor mechanical fuel pump
- Cooling system: water

Output
- Power output: 49 bhp (37 kW; 50 PS) @4,000 rpm; Tax horsepower 13.23

The Standard Flying Fourteen is an automobile which was produced by the British Standard Motor Company from 1937 to 1940 and announced in October 1936. The other Flying Standard models had been announced twelve months earlier. A standard is a flag and the reference to flying standards is to flying flags as well as to the advertised abilities of the cars.

== Bodies ==
The Standard Flying Fourteen was a four-door, five-seater saloon with a gently tapering body. From March 1937 the same specification was also made available as a 'Touring Saloon' incorporating increased luggage accommodation for touring "and the weekend golf clubs". Either body was provided on a 108-inch wheelbase with a 1,776 cc side-valve, four-cylinder engine. A catalogued drophead coupe variant was also available and in addition special coachwork by Avon was available as usual on all Standard models.

The wide (53 inches) rear seating was given extra knee-room by recesses in the backs of the front seats. Luxury rear standard fittings included folding tables. Draught-free ventilation came from swivelling quarter-lights. There were independent bucket seats in front with a settee type available if requested. Both seating and pedals were adjustable. The driver's steering column was telescopic. A flush-fitting sliding roof was provided. The Lucas mellotone wind-horns adjusted for town or country. The luxurious upholstery was unpleated.

The conventional shield-shaped radiator casing was replaced by a chromed vertically-barred "waterfall" grille in July 1937, earlier on some other Flying Standard models.

== Chassis ==
The engine was part of a single assembly including its clutch and gearbox. This assembly was held at three points in "live rubber" with a steadying bearing forward of the flywheel. Suspension was by long semi-elliptic springs at each corner of the car controlled by Luvax shock absorbers combined with a front (anti-roll) torsion bar. The chassis was mounted on large section tyres. Spare wheel and tyre were stowed in a separate compartment below the luggage locker. Permanent hydraulic jacks were built into the chassis. Both springs and frame pass beneath the back axle.

When production stopped, about 500 remaining chassis were used as the basis for the Standard Beaverette, a light armoured car created at short notice for home defence of the UK after the fall of France, and the loss of equipment during the Dunkirk evacuation in 1940.

== Road test ==
When on test The Times reported that, while the engine was not as smooth as a six-cylinder, the car felt sturdy and the controls proved easy to operate. The windscreen would open out far enough to provide the driver with a direct view.

== Jaguar ==
The Fourteen's engine and transmission were used by the Jaguar 1½ Litre, retrospectively known as the Jaguar Mk IV.

== Standard Ensign 1957 ==
A new model introduced at the October 1957 Motor Show, Standard Ensign, in this case with slightly reduced equipment levels from Standard's Vanguard, was given a 1670 cc engine and a four-speed gearbox with a then-popular sporting retro sturdy floor-mounted gear lever. The engine was less powerful than the Vanguard's but the car was considerably lighter and The Times regarded it as an unusually attractive car to drive recalling prewar Standard Flying Fourteens.
