= Standard Motor Company =

British motor vehicle manufacturer

Standard-Triumph International Limited
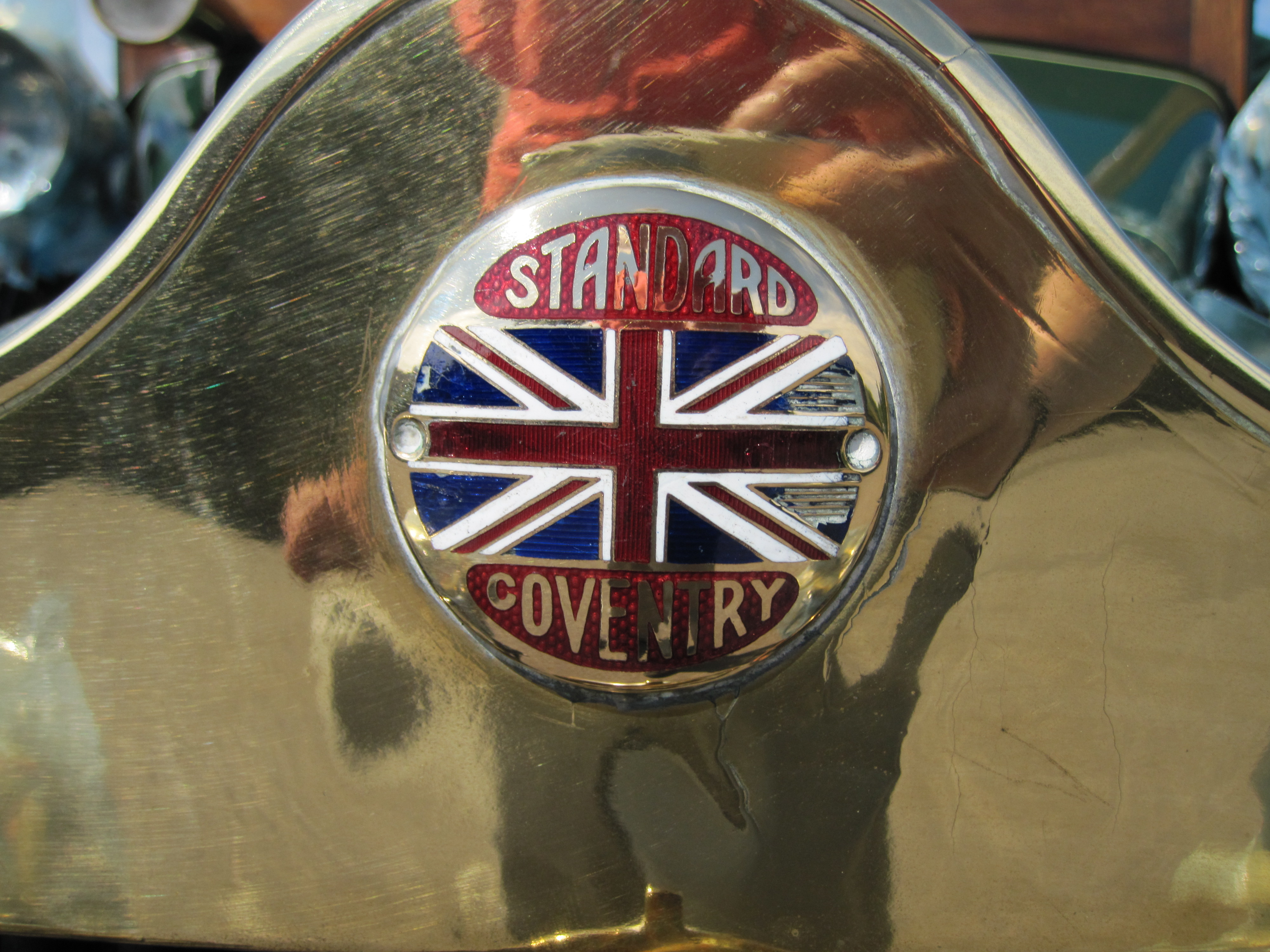

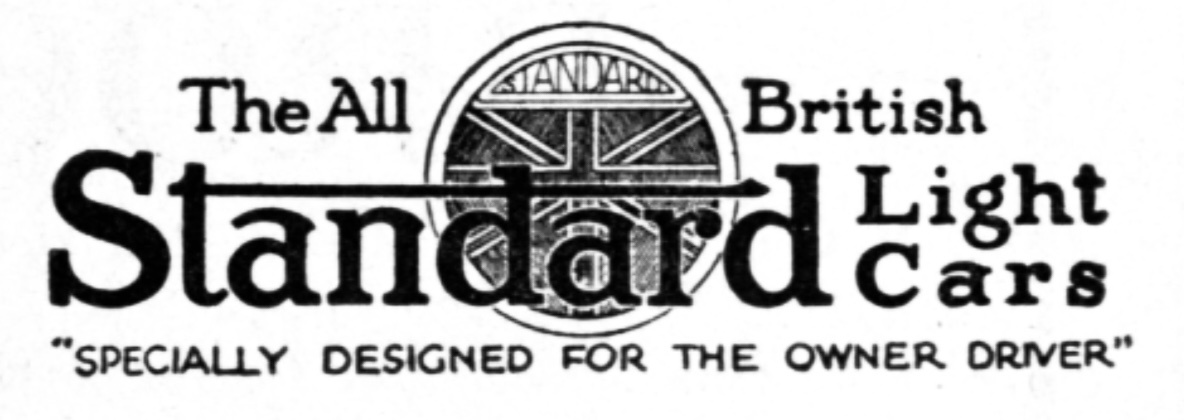
- Formerly: The Standard Motor Company Limited
- Industry: Automobile
- Founded: 1903 in Coventry, UK
- Founder: Reginald Walter Maudslay
- Defunct: 1968 (British Leyland)
- Fate: Purchased by Leyland Motors in 1960; Merged into British Leyland in 1968
- Headquarters: Canley, Coventry, England
- Key people: Reginald Walter Maudslay; Sir John Black
- Products: Motor vehicles and Ferguson tractors
- Brands: Standard, Triumph, Ferguson
- Parent: Independent (1903–1960); Leyland Motors (1960–1968)

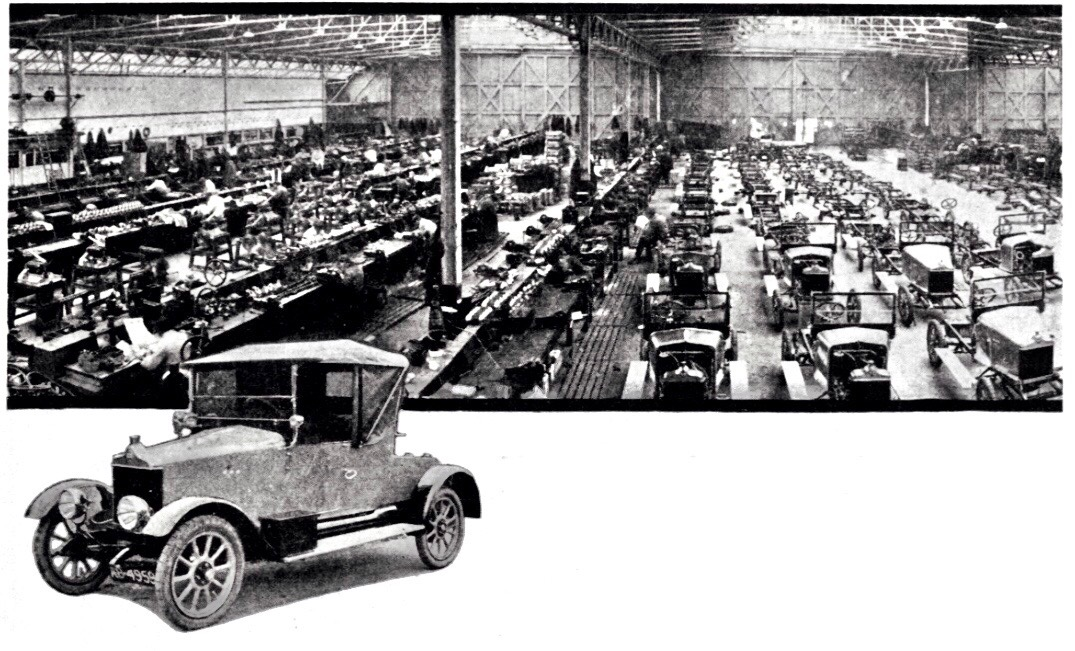
Standard production line (1920)

The Standard Motor Company Limited was a motor vehicle manufacturer, founded in Coventry, England, in 1903 by Reginald Walter Maudslay. For many years, it manufactured Ferguson TE20 tractors powered by its Vanguard engine. All Standard's tractor assets were sold to Massey Ferguson in 1959. Standard purchased Triumph in 1945 and, in 1959, officially changed its name to Standard-Triumph International and began to put the Triumph brand name on all its products. A new subsidiary, The Standard Motor Company Limited, was established and took over the manufacture of the group's products.

The Standard name was last used in Britain in 1963, and in India in 1988.

== History ==
=== 1903–1914 ===
Maudslay, great-grandson of the eminent engineer Henry Maudslay, had trained under Sir John Wolfe-Barry as a civil engineer. In 1902 he joined his cousin Cyril Charles Maudslay at his Maudslay Motor Company to make marine internal combustion engines. The marine engines did not sell very well, and still in 1902 they made their first engine intended for a car. It was fitted to a chain-drive chassis. The three-cylinder engine, designed by Alexander Craig was an advanced unit with a single overhead camshaft and pressure lubrication.

Realising the enormous potential of the horseless carriage and using a gift of £3,000 from Sir John Wolfe-Barry, R. W. Maudslay left his cousin and became a motor manufacturer on his own account. His Standard Motor Company was incorporated on 2 March 1903 and he established his business in a small factory in a two-storey building in Much Park Street, Coventry. Having undertaken the examination of several proprietary engines to familiarise himself with internal combustion engine design he employed seven people to assemble the first car, powered by a single-cylinder engine with three-speed gearbox and shaft drive to the rear wheels. By the end of 1903 three cars had been built and the labour force had been increased to twenty five. The increased labour force produced a car every three weeks during 1904.

The single-cylinder model was soon replaced by a two-cylinder model quickly followed by three- and four-cylinder versions and in 1905 the first six. Even the first cars boasted shaft drive as opposed to chains, and the engines were not merely "square" but had 6" diameter pistons with a 3" stroke. As well as supplying complete chassis, the company found a good market selling engines for fitting to other cars, especially where the owner wanted more power. Although Alex Craig, a Scottish engineer, was engaged to do much of the detail work, Maudslay himself was sufficiently confident to undertake much of the preliminary layout. One of the several derivations of the name "Standard" is said to have emanated from a discussion between Maudslay and Craig during which the latter proposed several changes to a design on the grounds of cost, which Maudslay rejected, saying that he was determined to maintain the best possible "standard". It is also worth noting that at that time, the word "standard" had positive connotations mostly related to military banners, and heraldic flags, especially in connection with royalty. It is only in more recent times that standard has come to mean a basic automobile, something less than the de luxe model.

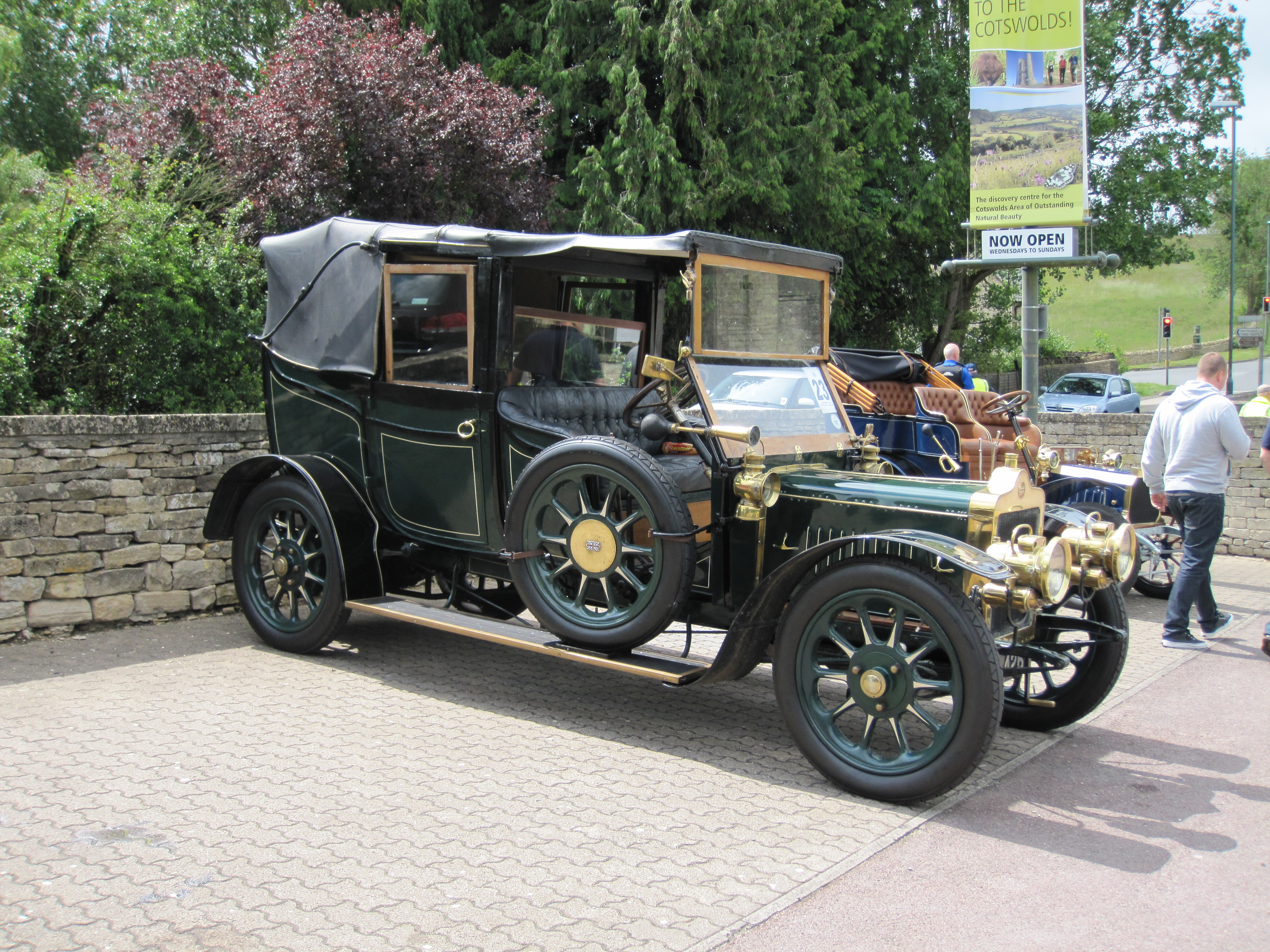
1910 Thirty cabriolet with division

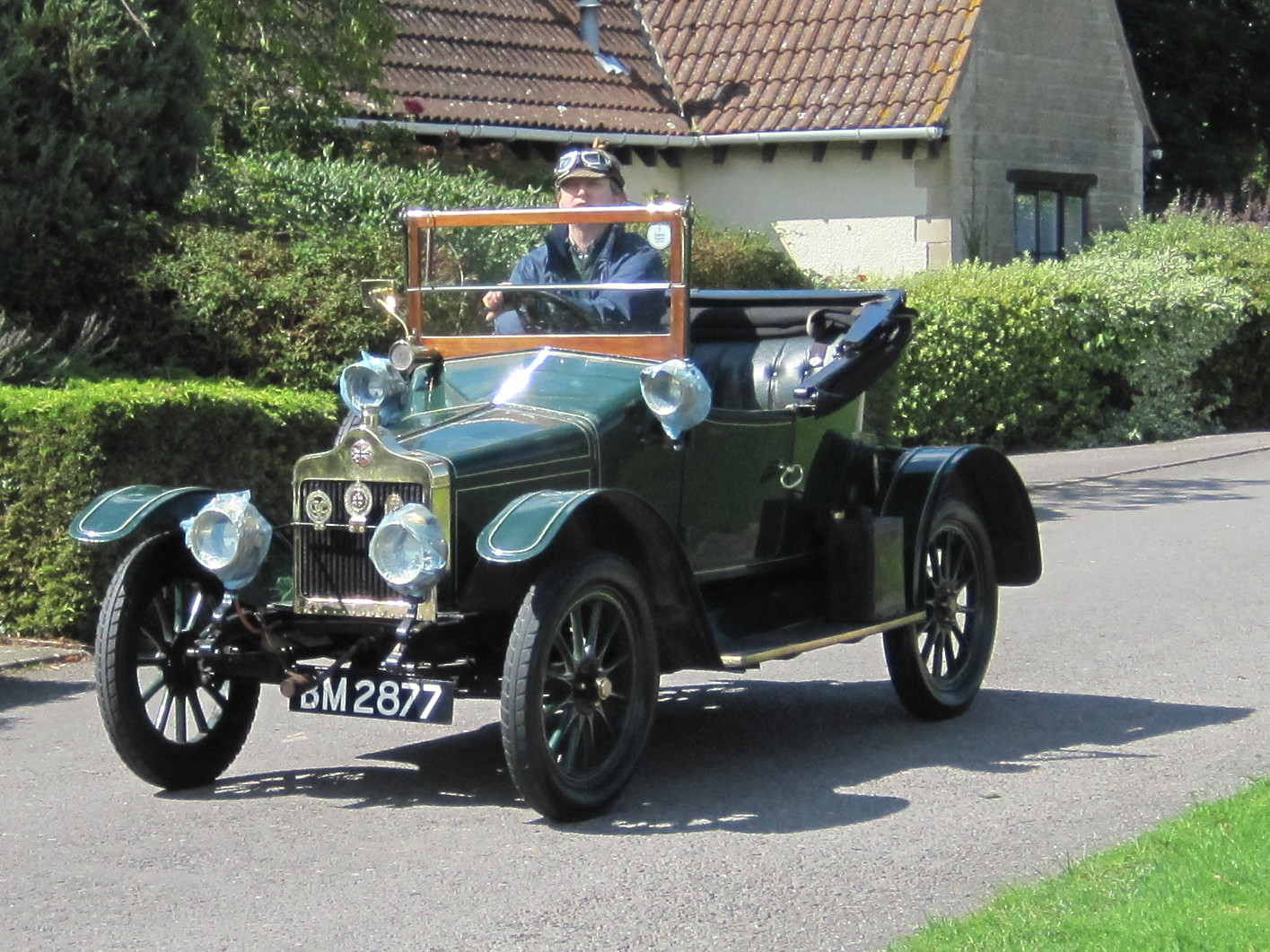
1913 Model S 2-seater tourer

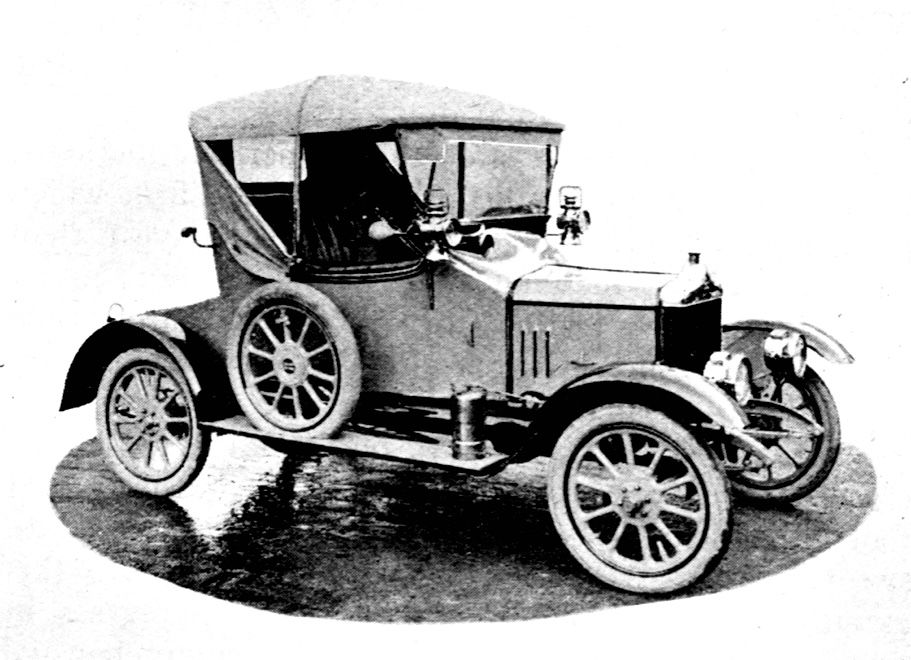
Standard (1917)

In 1905 Maudslay himself drove the first Standard car to compete in a race. This was the RAC Tourist Trophy in which he finished 11th out of 42 starters, having had a non-stop run. In 1905 the first export order was also received, from a Canadian who arrived at the factory in person. The order was reported in the local newspaper with some emphasis, "Coventry firm makes bold bid for foreign markets".

The company exhibited at the 1905 London Motor Show in Crystal Palace, at which a London dealer, Charles (later Sir Charles) Friswell (1872–1926) agreed to buy the entire factory output. He joined Standard and later was managing director for many years.

In late 1906 production was transferred to larger premises and output was concentrated on 6-cylinder models. The 16/20 h.p. tourer with side-entrance body was priced at £450. An indication of how much this was can be gained from the fact that a draughtsman earned £3 a week. In 1907 Friswell became company chairman. He worked hard to raise its profile, and the resulting increase in demand necessitated the acquisition of a large single-storey building in Cash's Lane, Coventry. Even this was inadequate after the publicity gained when a fleet of 20 cars, 16/20 tourers, were supplied for the use of Commonwealth editors attending the 1909 Imperial Press Conference in London. In 1909 the company first made use of the famous Union Flag Badge, a feature of the radiator emblem until after the Second World War. By 1911 the range of vehicles was comprehensive, with the 8-horsepower model being produced in quantity whilst a special order for two 70 hp cars was at the same time executed for a Scottish millionaire. Friswell's influence culminated in supplying seventy 4-cylinder 16 hp cars for King George V and his entourage, including the Viceroy of India, at the 1911 Delhi Durbar. In 1912 Friswell sold his interest in Standard to C. J. Band and Siegfried Bettmann, the founder of the Triumph Motor Cycle Company (which became the Triumph Motor Company). During the same year the first commercial vehicle was produced, and the 4-cylinder model "S" was introduced at £195, the first to be put into large-scale production. 1,600 were produced before the outbreak of the First World War, 50 of them in the final week of car production. These cars were sold with a three-year guarantee. In 1914 Standard became a public company.

=== First World War ===
During the First World War the company produced more than 1,000 aircraft, including the Royal Aircraft Factory B.E.12, Royal Aircraft Factory R.E.8, Sopwith Pup and Bristol F.2-B in a new works at Canley that opened on 1 July 1916. Canley would subsequently become the main centre of operations. Other war materials produced included shells, mobile workshops for the Royal Engineers, and trench mortars.

=== 1919–1939 ===
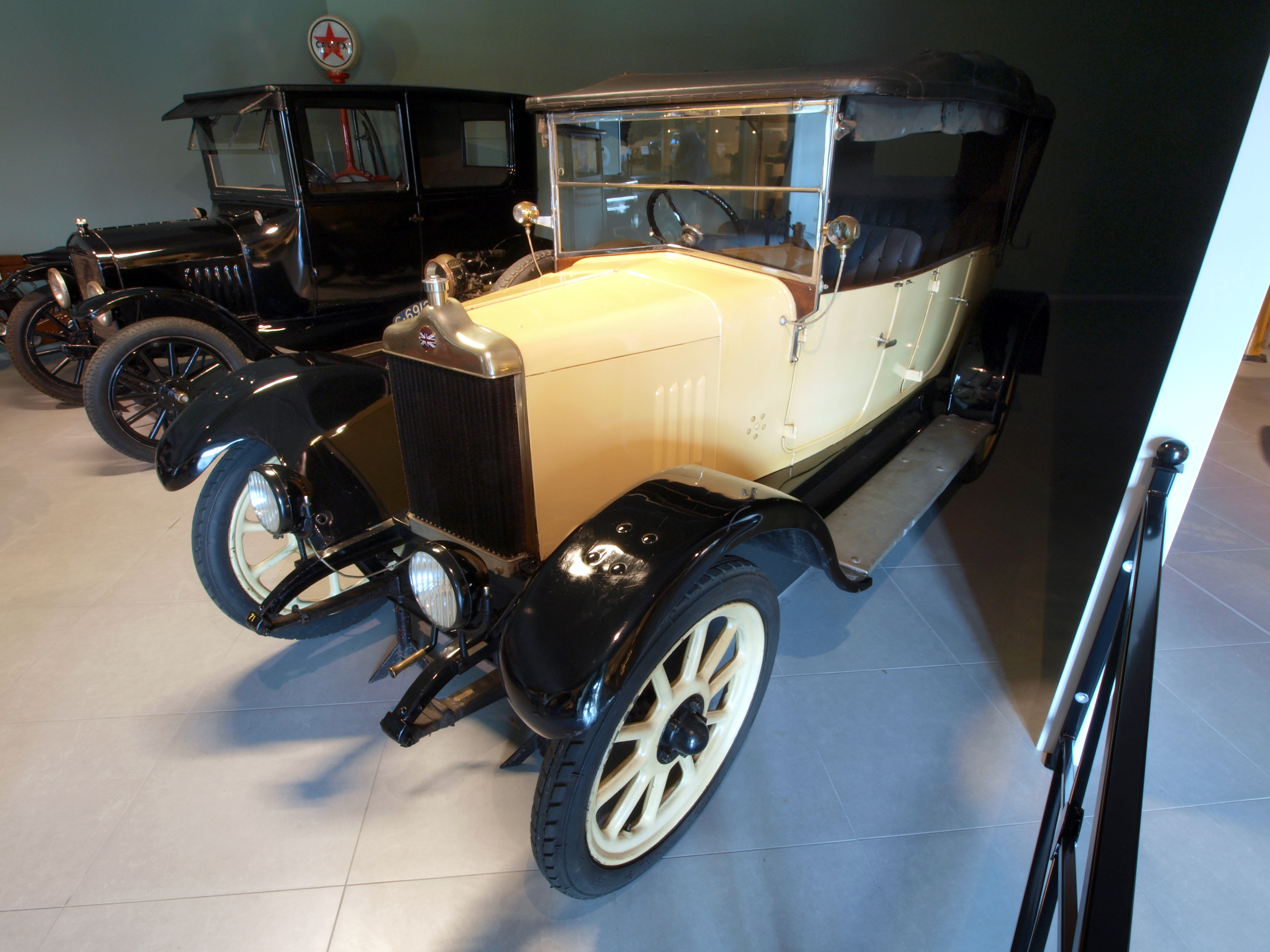
1922 Eleven 4-door tourer

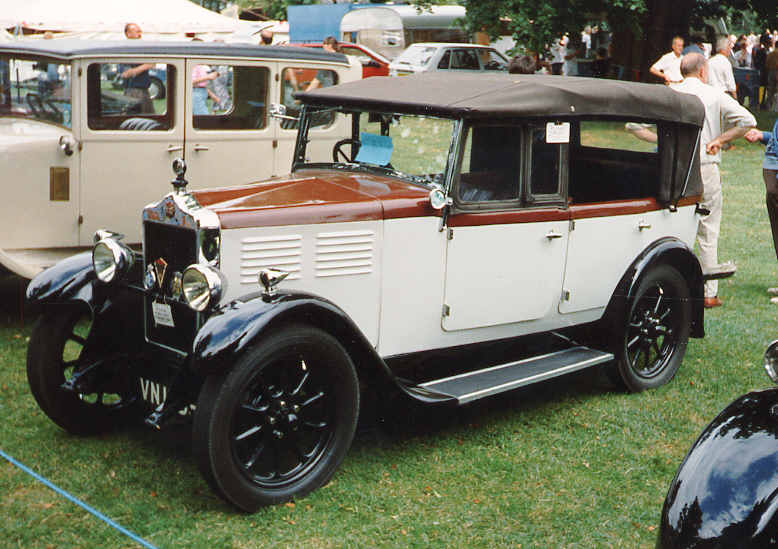
1927 Nine Selby 4-seater tourer

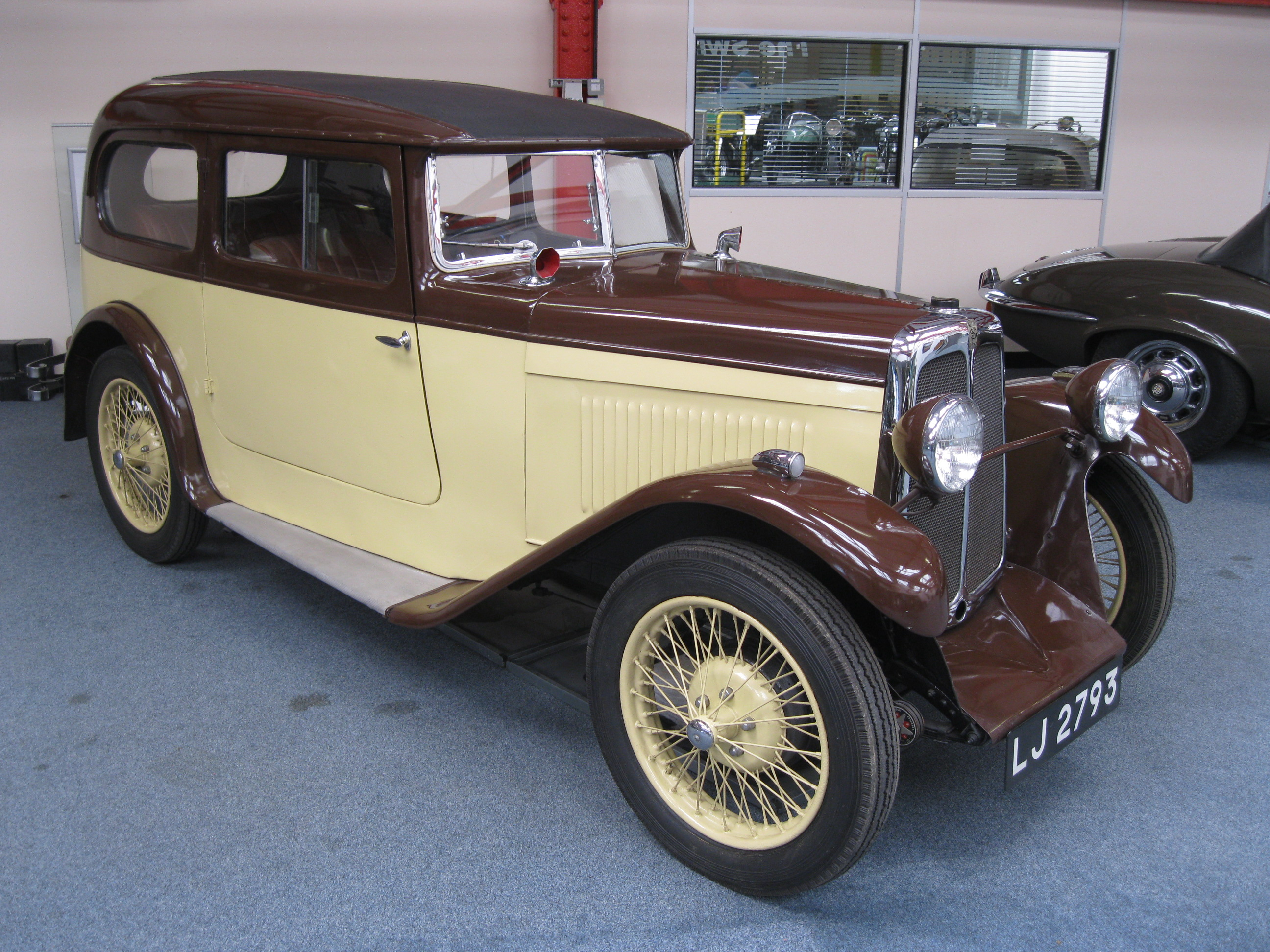
1930 Standard Swallow 2-door sports saloon on a Big Nine chassis

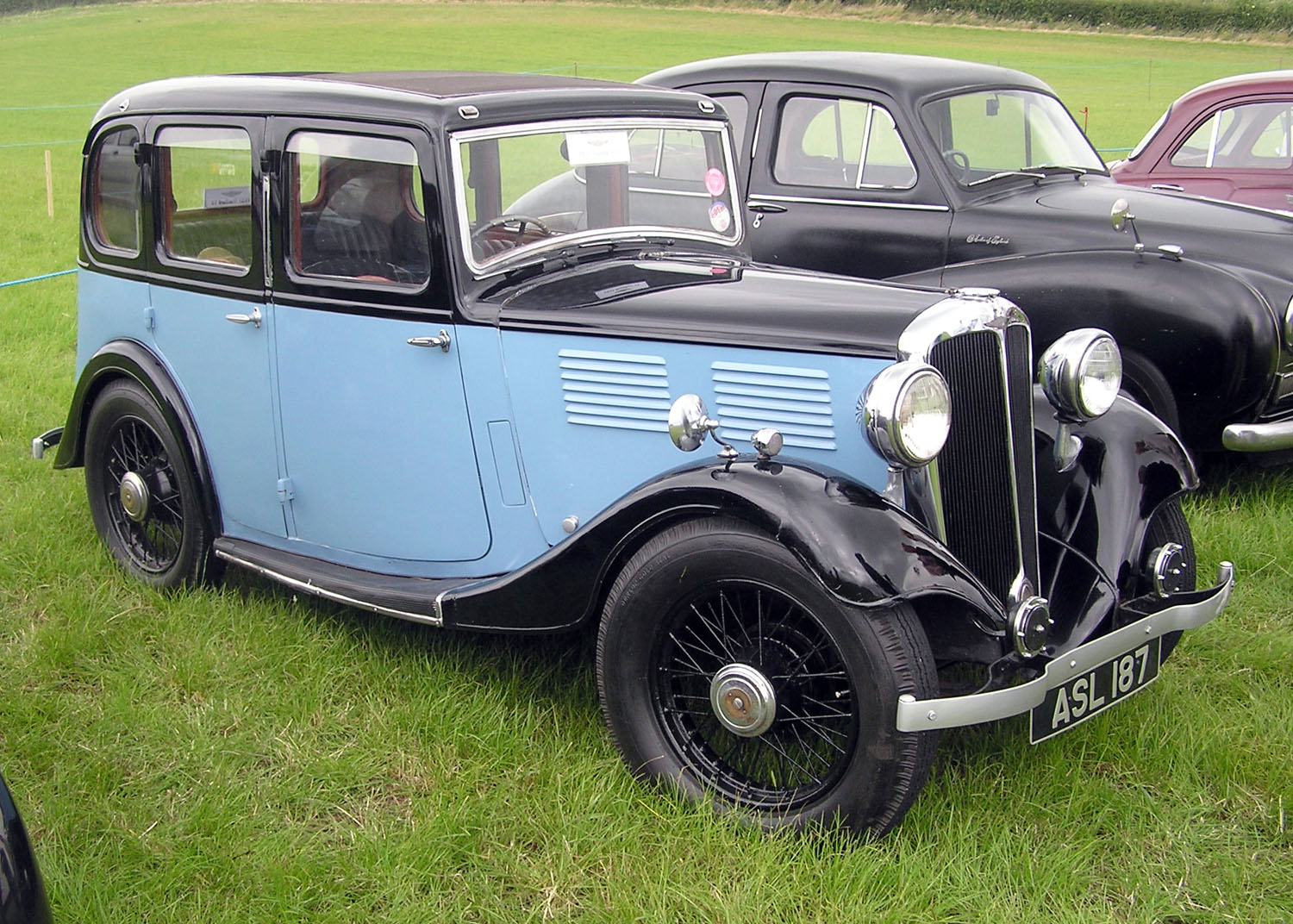
1933 Ten 4-door saloon

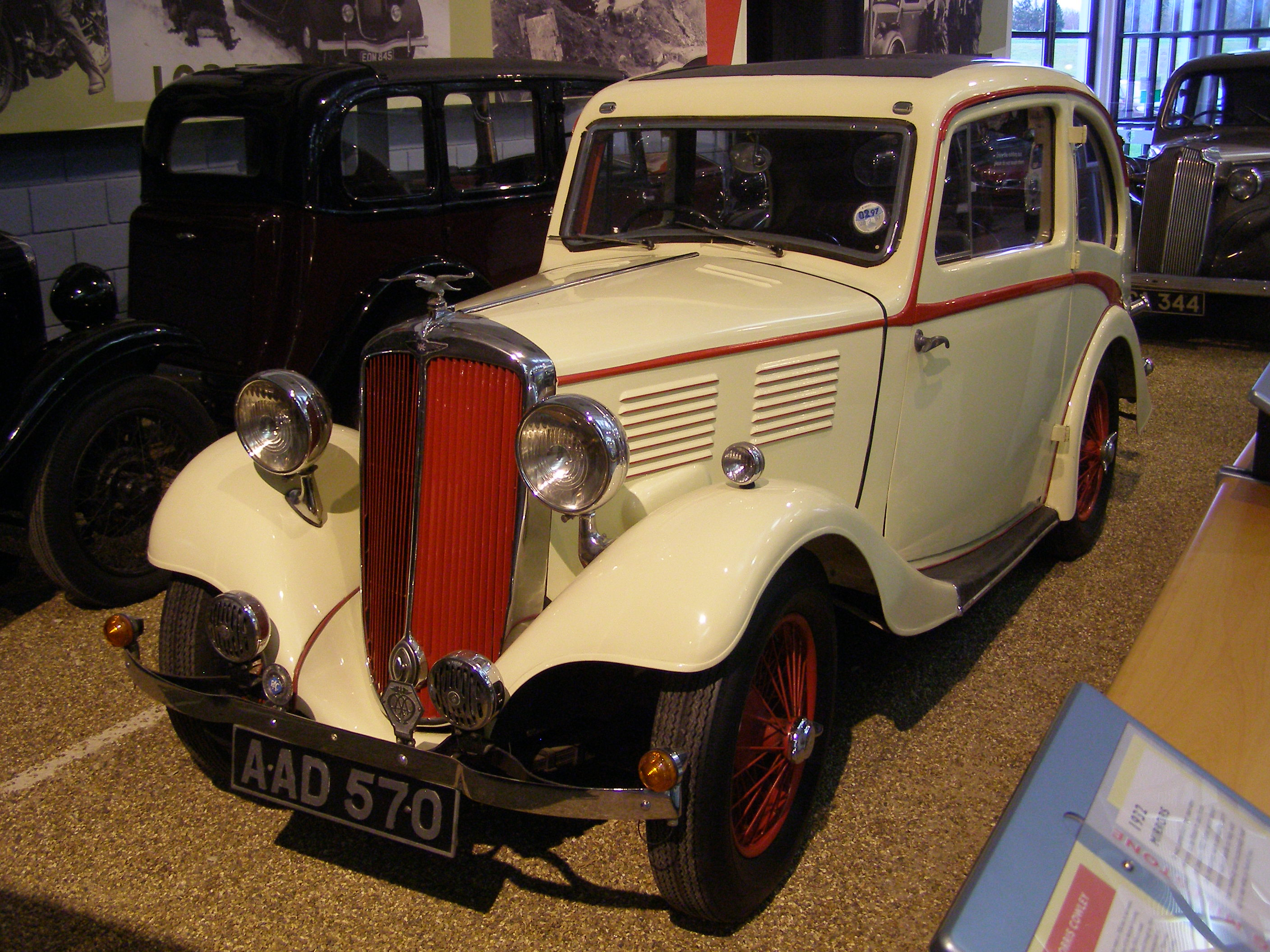
1934 10/12 Speedline sports coupé

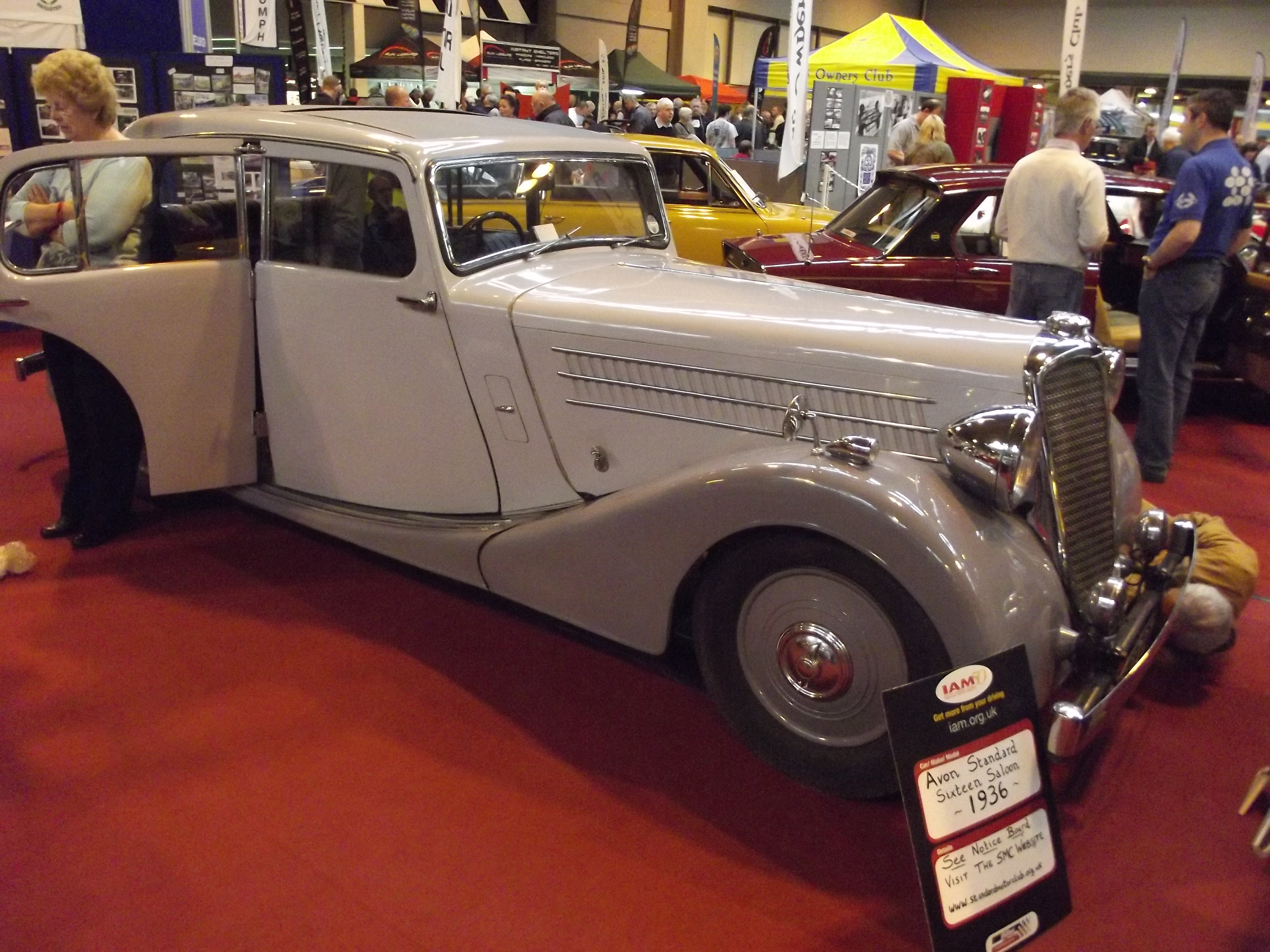
1936 4-door sports saloon by Avon on a Sixteen chassis

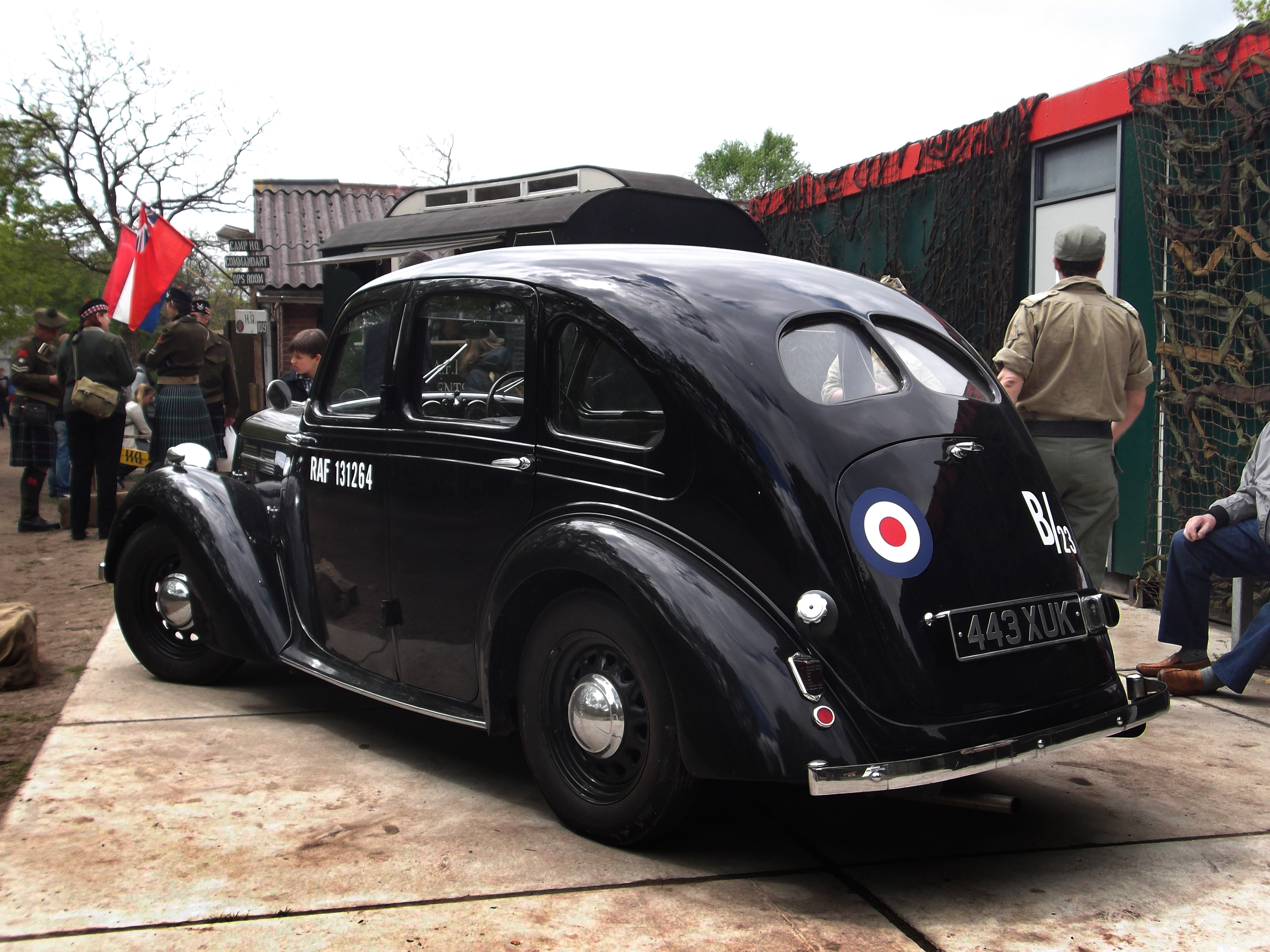
1937 Flying Twelve 4-door saloon RAF

Civilian car production was restarted in 1919 with models based on pre-war designs, for example the 9.5 model "S" was re-introduced as the model SLS although this was soon superseded by an 8 h.p. model.

In the early 1920s saloon bodies were first offered; previously all cars had been tourers. The bodies had, since the move to Bishopsgate Green, been made in Coventry by the company itself, but it was not until 1922 that they were mass-produced, using a wooden track along which they were pushed by hand. The company was justifiably proud of the modern factory at Canley, boasting in its advertisements "It is a beautifully lighted and well-aired factory standing on the edge of a breezy common away from the city din and smoke, that the finishing touches and test are given to the All British 'Standard' Light cars which issue there to almost every quarter in the world".

It was about this time during the early 1920s that the slogan "Count them on the road" appeared on every advertisement. By 1924 the company had a share of the market comparable to Austin Motor Company, making more than 10,000 cars in 1924. As the immediate post-war boom faded, many rival marques were discontinued. Cars became steadily larger and more elaborate as manufacturers sought to maintain sales. During the 1920s all the models were named after towns, not only near the factory such as Canley and Kenilworth but also further afield – Teignmouth, Falmouth and Exmouth.

By the late 1920s profits had decreased dramatically due to great reinvestment, a failed export contract and bad sales of the larger cars. In 1927 the inadvisability of matching the larger more elaborate trend became apparent and the 9 hp Fulham with fabric body was introduced at £185. Production was concentrated mainly on one basic chassis with a 9 hp engine. The importance of standardisation was now appreciated and only one alternative was offered. In 1929 John Black, a joint managing director of Hillman, took up an appointment at Standard as joint managing director.

==== Standard Swallow and Jaguar ====
Black encouraged the supply of chassis to external coachbuilders such as Avon and Swallow Coachbuilding and Jensen. The coachbuilding company of Avon during the early 1930s commenced producing cars with a distinctly sporty appearance, using as a foundation, a complete chassis from the Standard Motor Company. These chassis were ordinary production units, used because of their sound engineering design and good performance. Known as Avon Standard Specials they catered for a select market too small for Standard themselves.

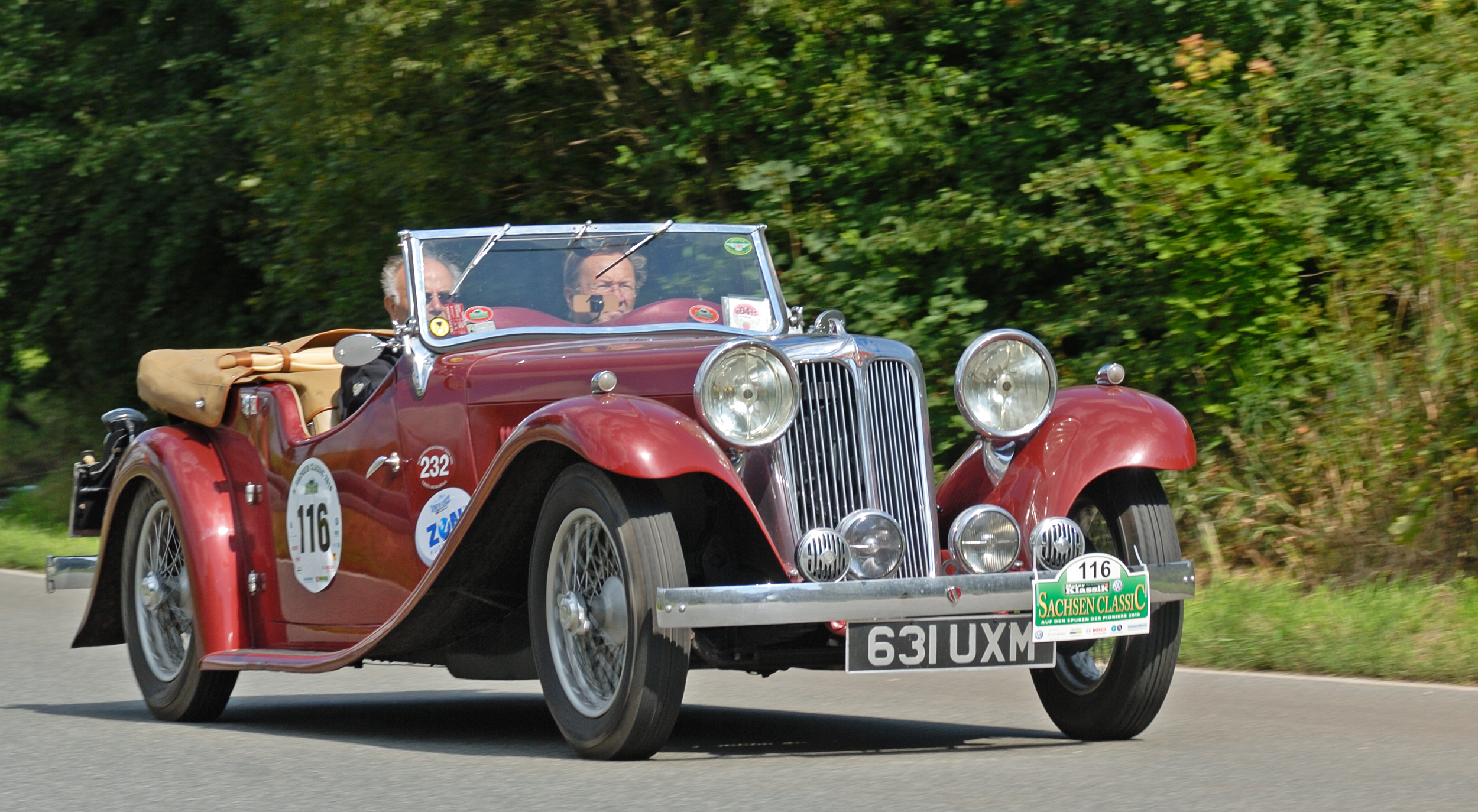
SS1, Engine and chassis by Standard but body designed by SS Cars

Swallow decided to produce a car under their own name using a Standard engine and chassis. A prototype SS 1 was displayed at London's October 1931 Motor Show and in 1932 Swallow were able to supply three models, two of them used the same body. Swallow's business was moved to SS Cars and began to use a model name of Jaguar for part of their range, then extended it to include their saloons. In 1945 SS Cars became Jaguar Cars and Standard still manufactured Jaguar's engines, though only the smallest remained a standard Standard design.

It was not until 1930, after the replacement of artillery wheels by spoke wheels that the distinctive radiator shape first used on the 6-cylinder models in 1906 was finally abandoned. In 1930, before the worst of the Depression, the Big Nine was introduced which together with the 6-cylinder Ensign and Envoy constituted the complete range. Here standardisation was taken a step further with the bodies on 9 hp four-cylinder and 15 hp six-cylinder being almost indistinguishable except for bonnet length. The Big Nine was soon followed by the Big Twelve and sales for the second six months of 1931 exceeded those of the whole of the previous year. In 1932 there was a Royal visit to the Canley works by the Duke of Gloucester who came to open the Canley Pavilion outside which he took delivery of a new 6-cylinder model.

Founder and Chairman Reginald Maudslay retired in 1934 and died soon afterwards on 14 December 1934 at the age of 64. Charles James Band 1883–1961, a Coventry solicitor and a Standard director since 1920, replaced him as chairman and served in that capacity until the beginning of 1954 though Sir John Black briefly held the appointment before he retired. 1935 saw all production transferred to the Canley site. Extensive re-organisation occurred including a continuous track being laid down in the paint shop on which the cars were completely painted.

Through the 1930s, fortunes improved with new models, the Standard Nine and Standard Ten addressed the low to mid range market. At the 1935 Motor Show the new range of Flying Standards was announced with (semi) streamlined bodies. The Flying Standards came to the market in 1936 with their distinctive streamlined sloping rears virtually replacing the existing range of Nine, Twelve, Sixteen, and Twenty. The Flying Standards were so-called because of the major radiator shell change to a waterfall grille topped by the Union Jack badge apparently streaming backwards in contrast to its previous forward-facing position.

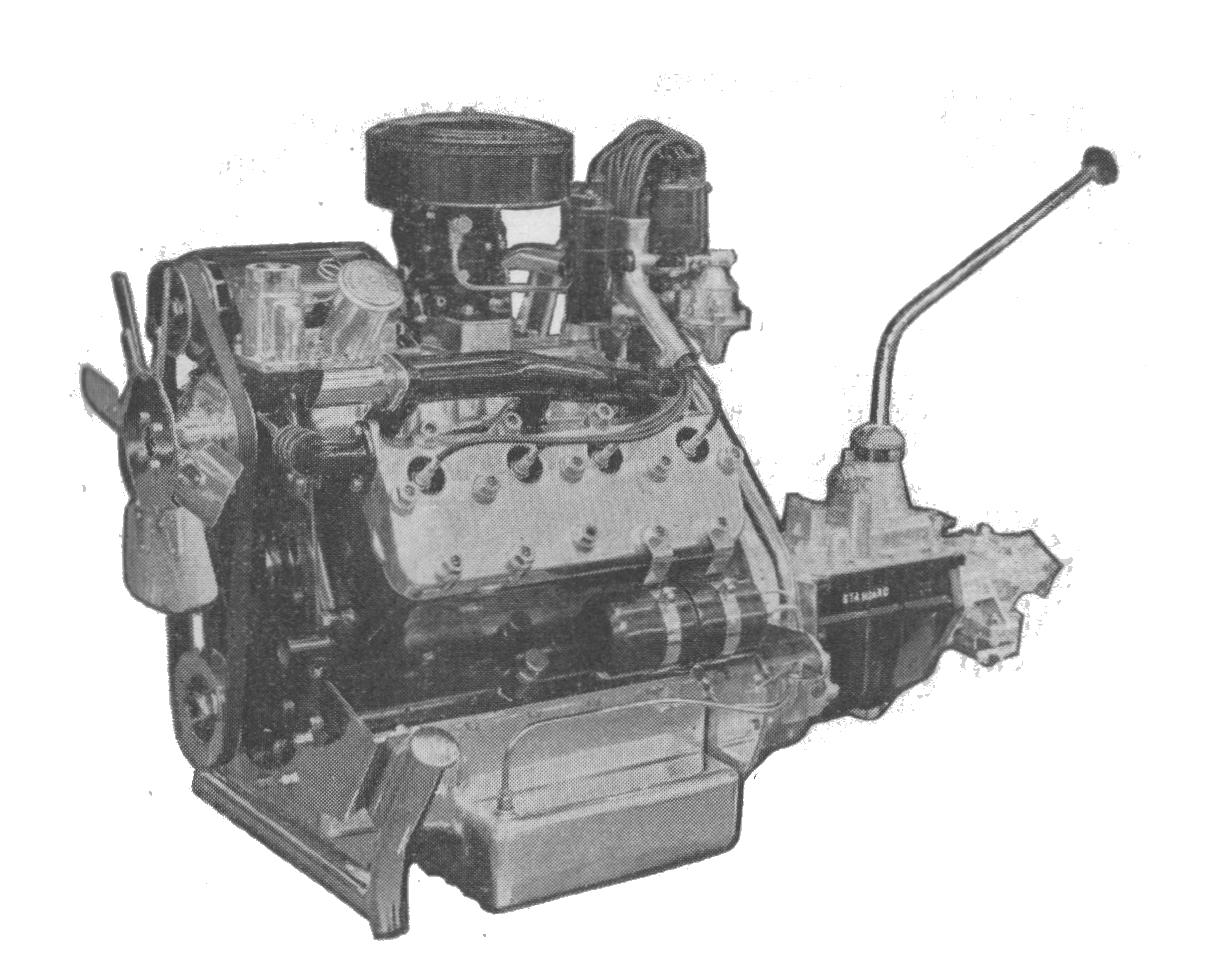
1936 20 hp V8

The Flying Nine, Flying Ten, Flying Twelve, and Flying Fourteen had four-cylinder engines, while the Flying Sixteen and Flying Twenty had six-cylinder engines. At the top of the range was the Standard Flying V-Eight, with a 20 RAC hp side-valve 90 degree V8 engine and a top speed of more than 80 mph (130 km/h). 250 Flying V-Eights were made from 1936 to 1937; they were offered for sale from 1936 to 1938 with the initial price of £349 lowered to £325 in the last year to clear inventory.

In 1938 a new factory was opened at Fletchampstead. That year, Standard launched the Flying Eight. The Flying Eight had a new four-cylinder engine smaller than that in the Flying Nine, and was the first British mass-produced light saloon with independent front suspension. The Flying Ten and Flying Twelve were also given new chassis with independent front suspension in 1938.

Construction of the aero engine plant at Banner Lane, a shadow factory, began in mid 1939, and engine production began in 1940. It was managed by Standard for the Air Ministry. After the war Standard leased Banner Lane and, in partnership with Harry Ferguson, used it for the manufacture of Ferguson tractors.

By the beginning of the war, Standard's annual production was approximately 50,000 units.

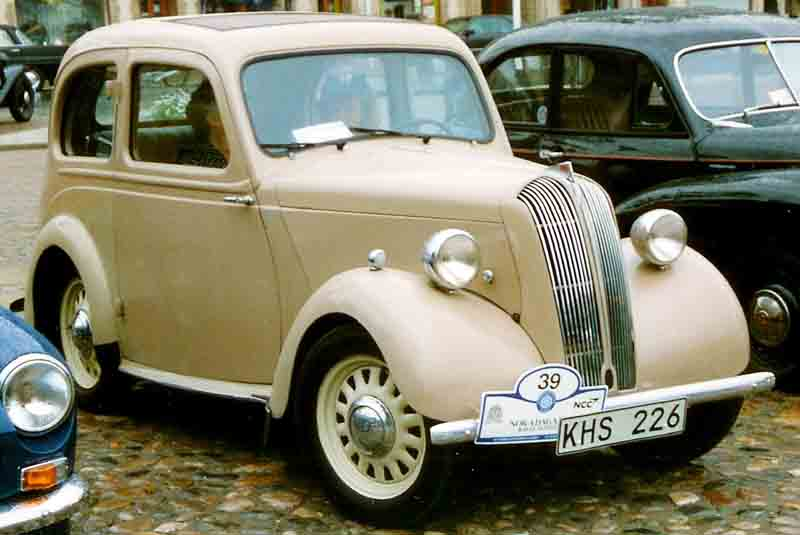
1946 Eight 2-door saloon

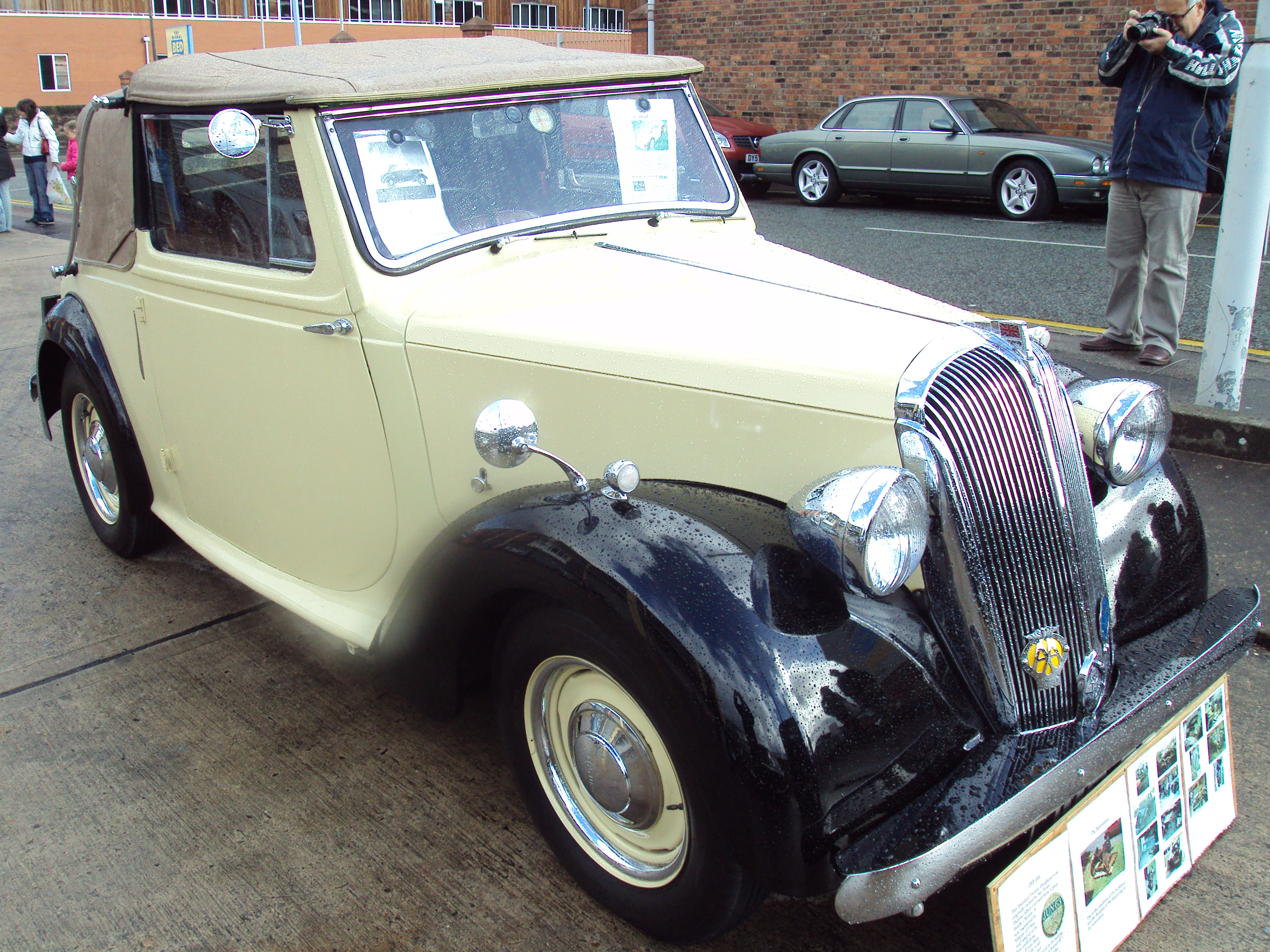
1947 Twelve drophead coupé

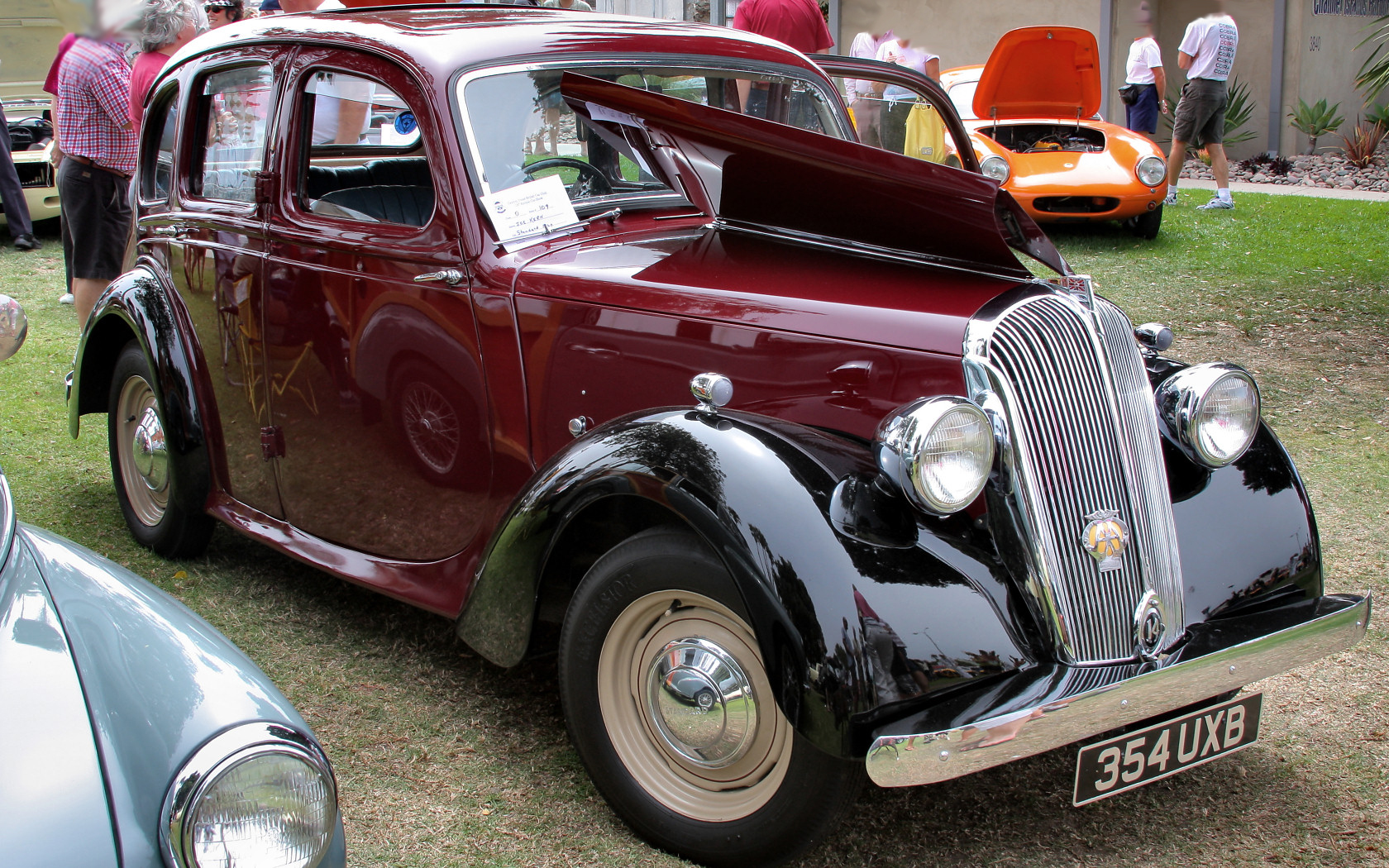
1948 Fourteen 4-door saloon

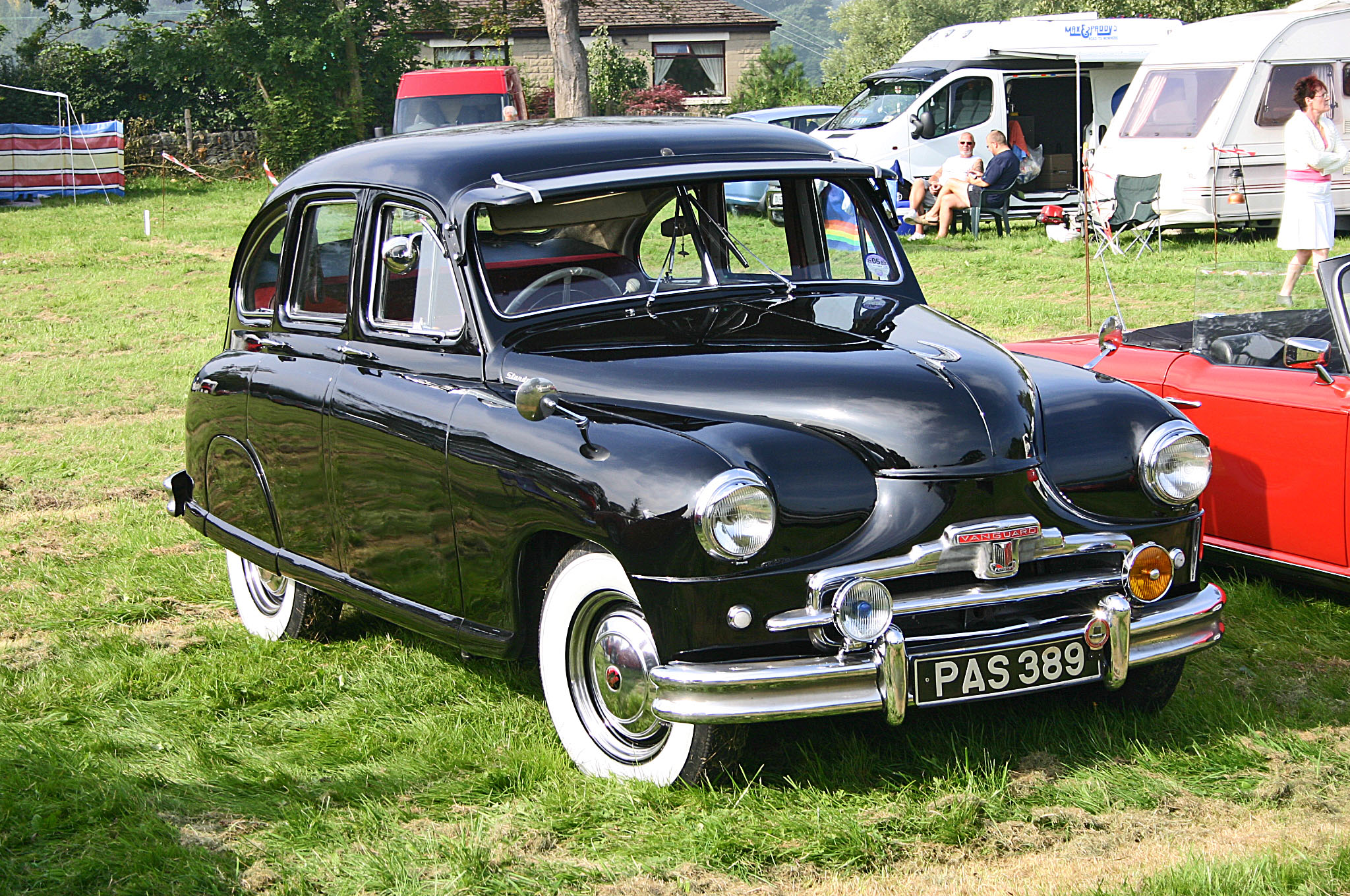
1952 Vanguard Phase 1A

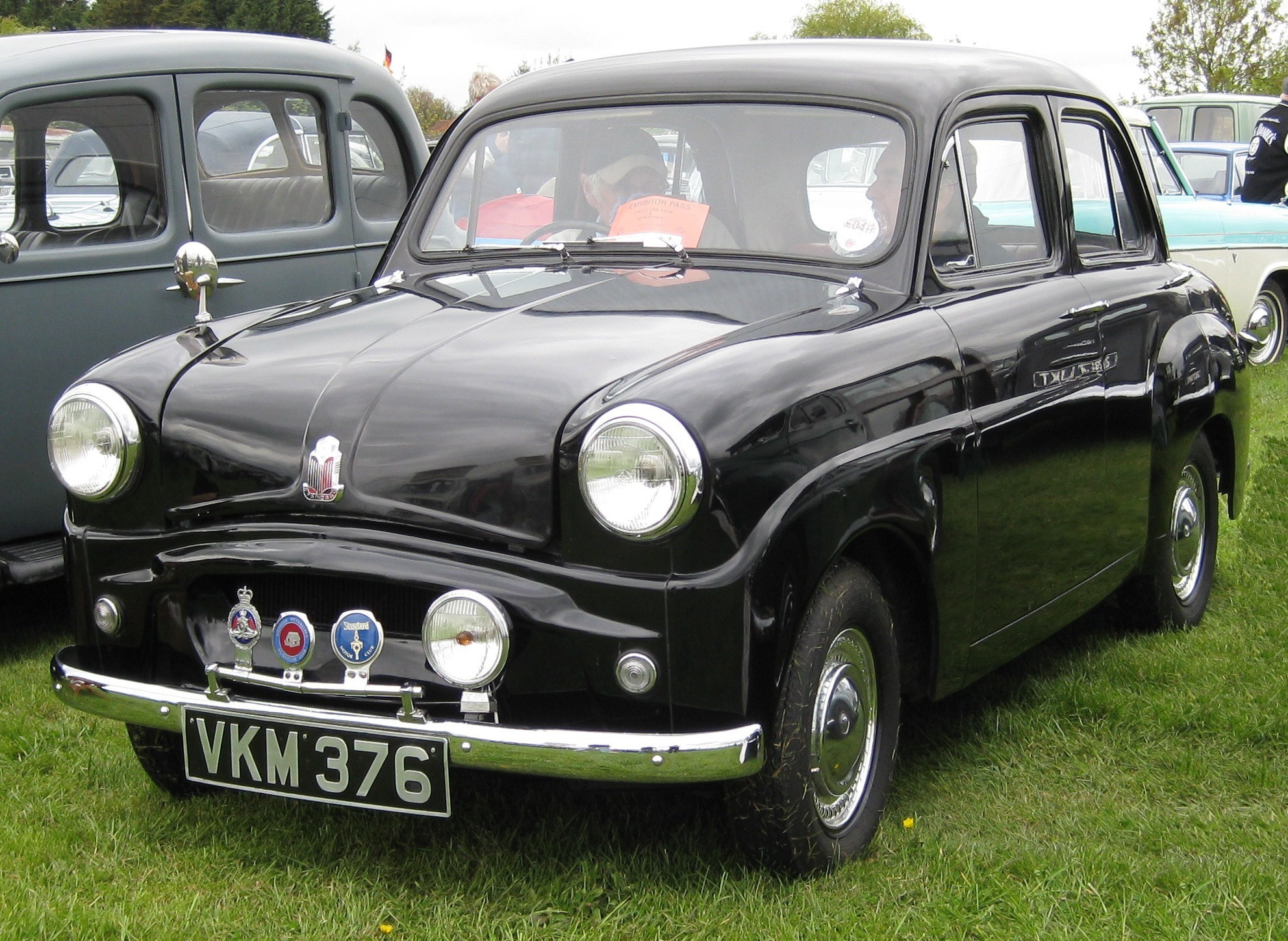
c. 1953 Eight

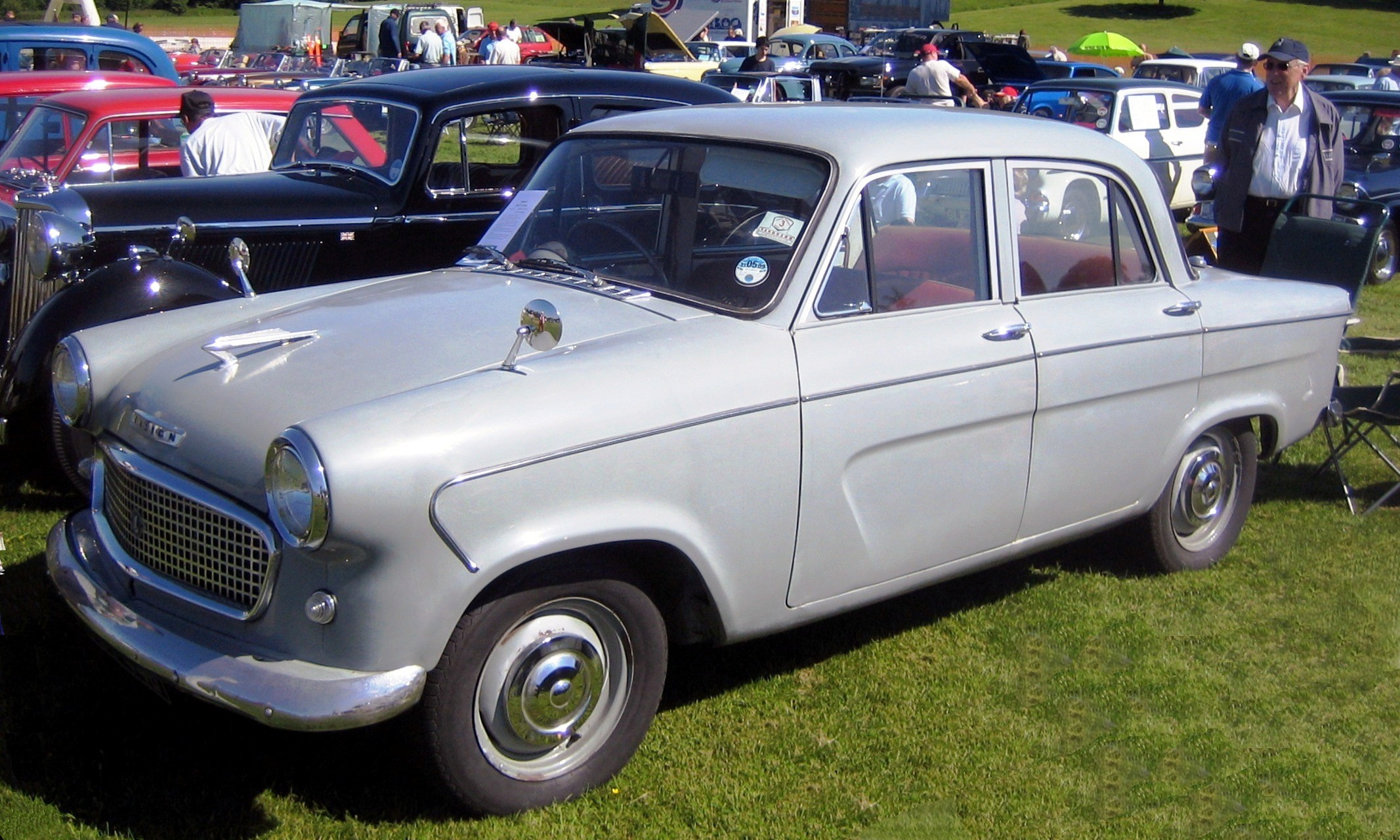
1956 Ensign. It shared the Vanguard Series III body, but had a reduced specification. It was popular with the RAF.

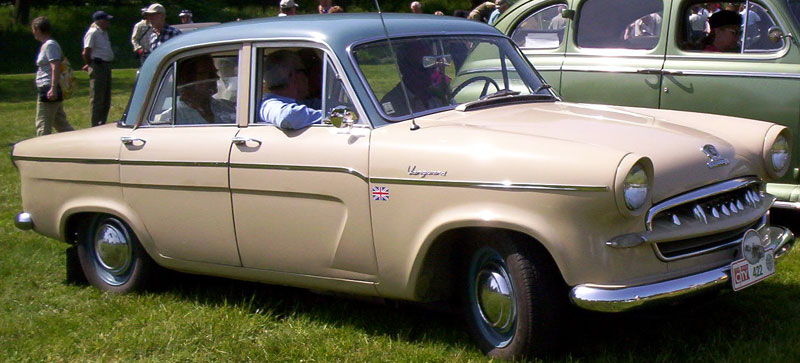
1958 Vanguard

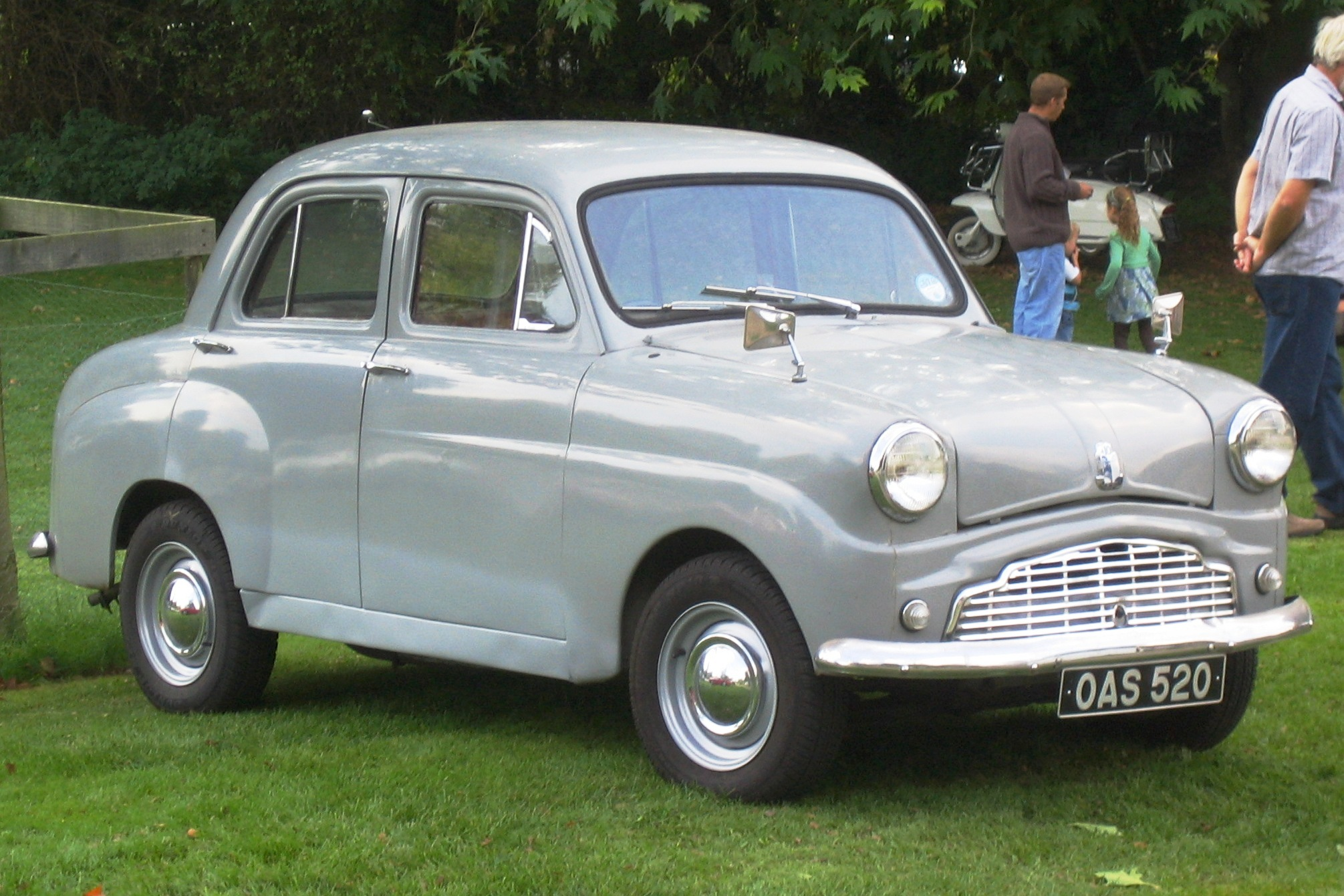
1959 Ten

=== Second World War ===
The company continued to produce its cars during the Second World War, but now mainly fitted with utility bodies ("Tillys"). However, the most famous war-time product was the de Havilland Mosquito aircraft, mainly the FB VI version, of which more than 1,100 were made. 750 Airspeed Oxfords were also made as well as 20,000 Bristol Mercury VIII radial engines, and 3,000 Bristol Beaufighter fuselages.

Standard's output included 4000 Beaverette light armoured cars, the first ones built from Standard Flying Fourteen chassis and a prototype lightweight "Jeep" type vehicle.

=== Post-war years ===
With peace, the pre-war Eight, and the Twelve (now fitted with a larger 1776cc engine and sold as the Fourteen, were quickly back in production using tools carefully stored since 1939. Of greater significance was the 1945 purchase, arranged by Sir John Black for £75,000, of the Triumph Motor Company. Triumph had gone into receivership in 1939, and was now reformed as a wholly owned subsidiary of Standard, named Triumph Motor Company (1945) Limited. The Triumph factory was near Coventry city centre and had been completely destroyed in the blitz. A lucrative deal was also arranged to build the small Ferguson Company tractor. This arrangement was considered primarily by Black as a means to securing increased profits to fund new car development.

==== Ferguson tractor ====
In December 1945 Standard Motor Company Limited announced that an arrangement had been made to manufacture Harry Ferguson's tractors and the Air Ministry's shadow factory at Banner Lane Coventry run by Standard during the war would be used for the project. These tractors would be for the Eastern hemisphere, Ferguson tractors built by Ford in America for the Western hemisphere. Production was expected to start in 1946. Implements would be sourced separately by Ferguson who would also merchandise the tractors and the implements.

==== Standard Vanguard ====
A one-model policy for the Standard marque (alongside a range of new Triumphs) was adopted in 1948 with the introduction of the 2-litre Standard Vanguard, which was styled on American lines by Walter Belgrove, and replaced all the carry-over pre-war models. This aptly named model was the first true post-war design from any major British manufacturer. The beetle-back Vanguard Phase 1 was replaced in 1953 by the notch-back Phase 2 and in 1955 by the all-new Phase 3, which resulted in variants such as the Sportsman, Ensign, Vanguard Vignale and Vanguard Six.

==== Standard Eight and Ten ====
The one-model policy lasted until 1953, when a new Standard Eight small car was added. This was introduced at £481 7s. 6d the cheapest four-door saloon on the market, yet it had independent front suspension, hydraulic brakes and an economical OHV engine. At the same time in another part of the same building Standards were producing a very different engine, the Rolls-Royce Avon jet aero engine of which 415 were made between 1951 and 1955. In 1954 the Eight was supplemented by the slightly more powerful Standard Ten which featured a wider chrome grille.

==== Engines ====
The Phase II Vanguard was powered, like the Phase I, by a 2088 cc 4-cylinder "wet sleeve" engine, now with a modestly increased compression ratio, and producing 68 hp. This engine could be modified by using an additional intake system and two single-barrel Solex carburettors, producing 90 hp. Typically, the Phase II engine was one Solex carburettor, with 85 mm by 93 mm pistons. Standard Motors at the time supplied many of these engines to Ferguson Tractor distributed in the United States.

==== Standard Pennant ====
The Ten was followed in its turn in 1957 by the Standard Pennant featuring very prominent tail fins, but otherwise little altered structurally from the 1953 Standard Eight. An option for the Ten, and standard fitment to the Pennant, was the Gold Star engine, tuned for greater power and torque than the standard 948 cc unit. Another tuning set, featuring a different camshaft and twin carburettors, was available from dealers. As well as an overdrive for the gearbox, an option for the Eight, Ten and Pennant was the Standrive, a semi-manual transmission that automatically operated the clutch during gearchanges.

==== Triumph TR2 ====
During the same year that the '8' was introduced, another car was displayed at the London Motor Show. This was the Triumph 20TS, a sports two-seater with a modified Standard '8' chassis and a Vanguard engine. The 20TS's lack of luggage space and unsatisfactory performance and handling resulted in production being delayed until the next year when the chassis and drivetrain were developed and the body was restyled to incorporate a generous boot. The car was badged as a 'Triumph' rather than a 'Standard' and the Triumph TR2 was a winner. Ken Richardson achieved 124 mph (200 km/h) on the Jabbeke Highway in Belgium in a slightly modified car. As a result of the publicity, small manufacturers, including Morgan, Peerless, Swallow, and Doretti, bought engines and other components from Standard Motor Company.

==== Standard Atlas van ====
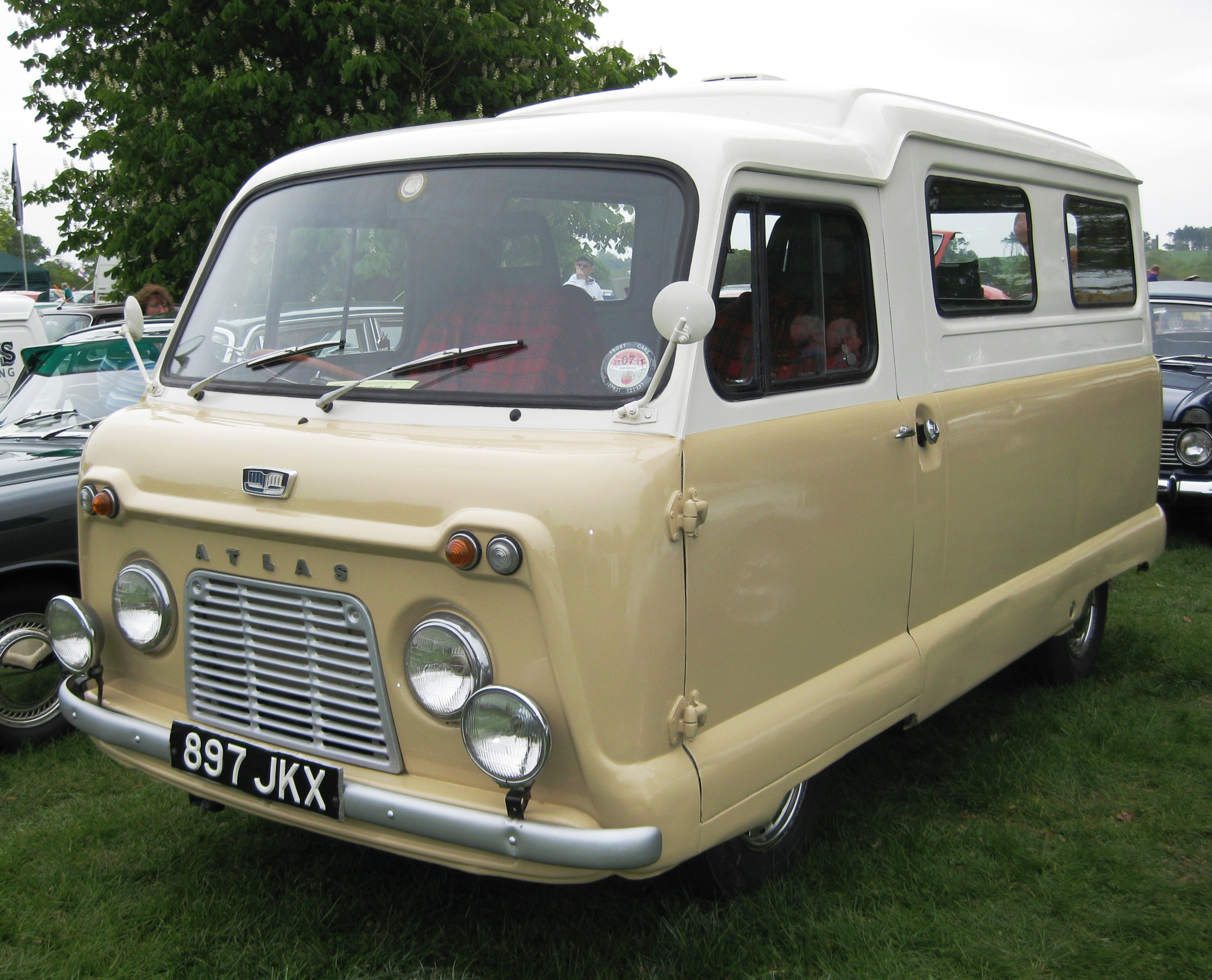
Atlas van 1959. In a segment dominated, in the UK market, by the Bedford CA, a number of UK vehicle manufacturers competed with under-powered forward control competitors. The Atlas was Standard-Triumph's contender.

In 1958 the Standard Atlas panel van and pick-up was first marketed, a cab-over-engine design. It initially used the 948 cc engine from the Standard 10, making the resulting vehicle woefully underpowered, even with its 6.66:1 final drive ratio. In 1961, the Atlas Major was introduced, and sold alongside the original 948 cc Atlas. This variant was powered by the Standard 1670 cc wet-liner engine, as used with different capacities in the Vanguard cars, and the Ferguson tractor. The same engine was also used in Triumph TR2, TR3 and TR4 sports cars. To use this larger engine, a substantial redesign of the cab interior and forward chassis was necessary. The vehicles were of a high standard but not priced competitively, which resulted in relatively few sales. In 1963 the Atlas Major became the Standard 15, with a new long-wheelbase variant, with 2138 cc engine, which became the Standard 20. Later that year, the Standard name was dropped by Leyland, and these models were rebranded hastily as the Leyland 15 and 20. By 1968 when production ended in the UK, all variants were powered by the 2138 cc engine and badged as Leyland 20s. These vehicles were badged as Triumphs for export to Canada, and possibly other overseas markets. The van's tooling was also exported to India after UK production ceased, where the resultant vehicle continued in production until the 1980s.

==== Triumph Herald ====
By the later 1950s the small Standards were losing out in the UK market to more modern competitor designs, and the Triumph name was believed to be more marketable; hence the 1959 replacement for the Eight, Ten and Pennant was badged as the Triumph Herald; with substantial mechanical components carried over from the small Standards. Despite the separate chassis and independent rear suspension, the differential, hubs, brakes, engine and gearbox were all common to the last Standard Pennants. In order to build the Herald the company invested £2.5 million in a new assembly hall extension at the Canley plant which Standard had acquired in 1916. Inside the building were three 1300 ft assembly lines equipped to be one of the most modern car assembly plants in the world. This turned out to be the company's last investment on such a scale at Canley: investment decisions after the merger with Rover would favour the newer plant at Solihull.

==== Overseas plants ====
Overseas manufacturing plants were opened in Australia, France, India and South Africa. Overseas assembly plants were opened in Canada, Ireland and New Zealand.

=== Sir John Black ===
During the year ended 31 August 1954 Standard made and sold 73,000 cars and 61,500 tractors and much more than half of those were exported. Since the war Standard had made and sold some 418,000 cars and 410,000 tractors and again much more than half were exported. Appointed to Standard's then ailing business in 1929, director and general manager since 1930 and appointed managing director in 1934 energetic Sir John Black resigned as chairman and managing director of Standard that year following a serious motorcar accident. He was advised (after consultations with his wife and close friends) to relinquish his offices of chairman and managing director and his membership of the board of directors. His deputy and long-time personal assistant, Alick Dick 1916–1986, took his position as managing director. Air Marshal Lord Tedder was appointed chairman, Tedder would hold that position until the Leyland Motors takeover at the end of 1960. Alick Dick resigned in August 1961 when the board was reorganised by Leyland in view of the substantial losses Standard was accumulating.

The company started considering partners to enable continued expansion and negotiations were begun with Chrysler, Massey-Harris-Ferguson, Rootes Group, Rover and Renault but these were inconclusive.

==== Standard's Vanguard engine ====
The Vanguard's engine, later slightly enlarged, powered two saloons, a tractor and three sports cars

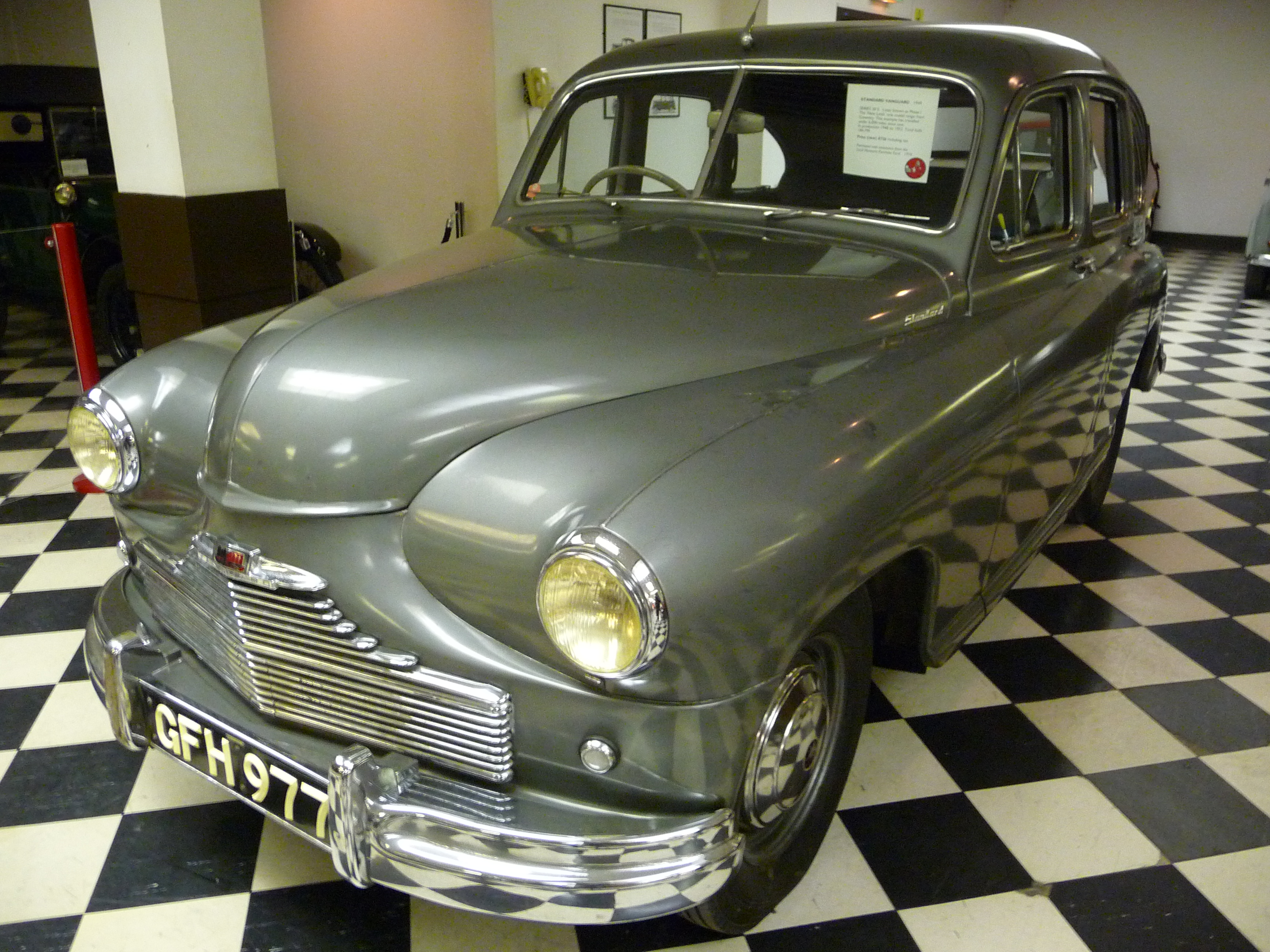
1949 Vanguard

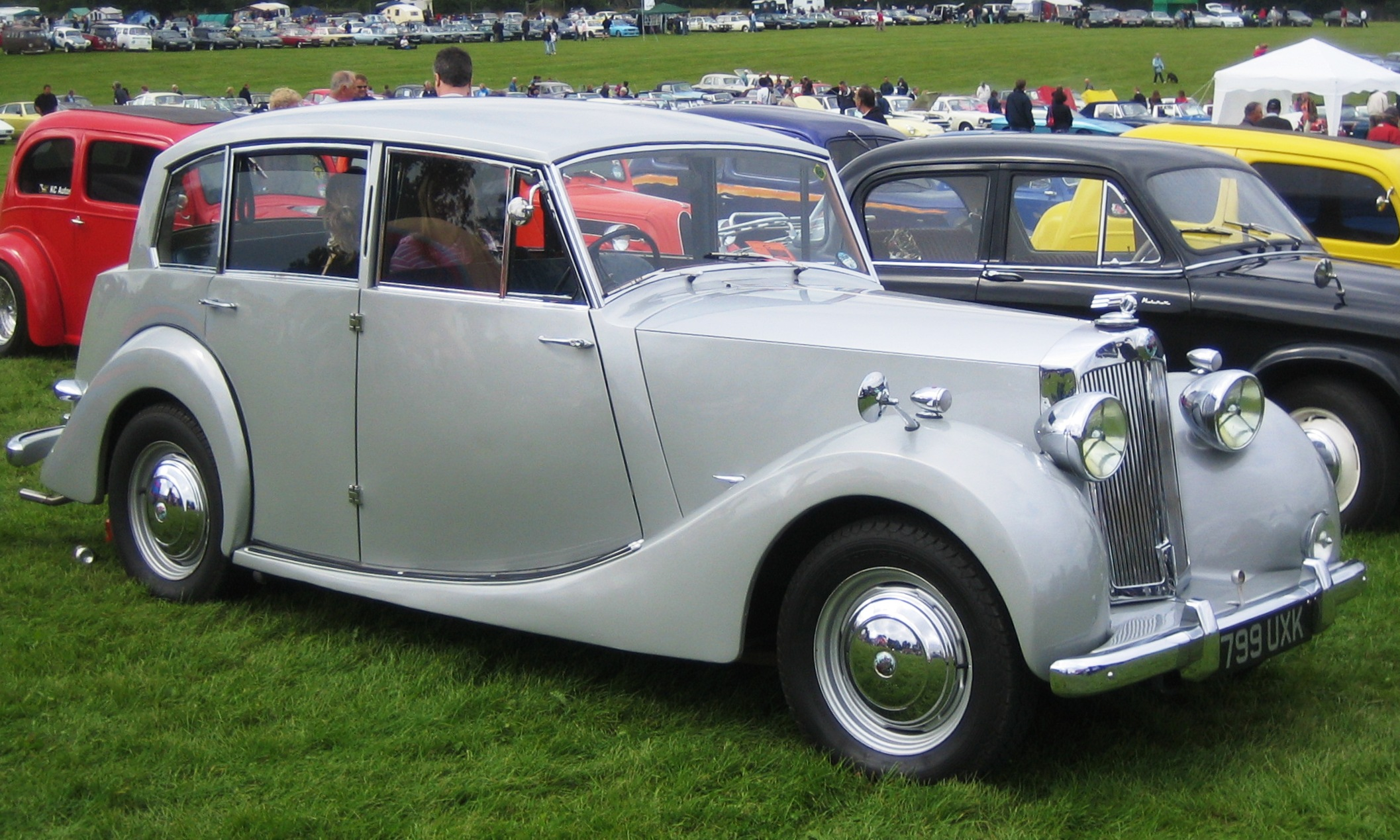
1954 Triumph Renown

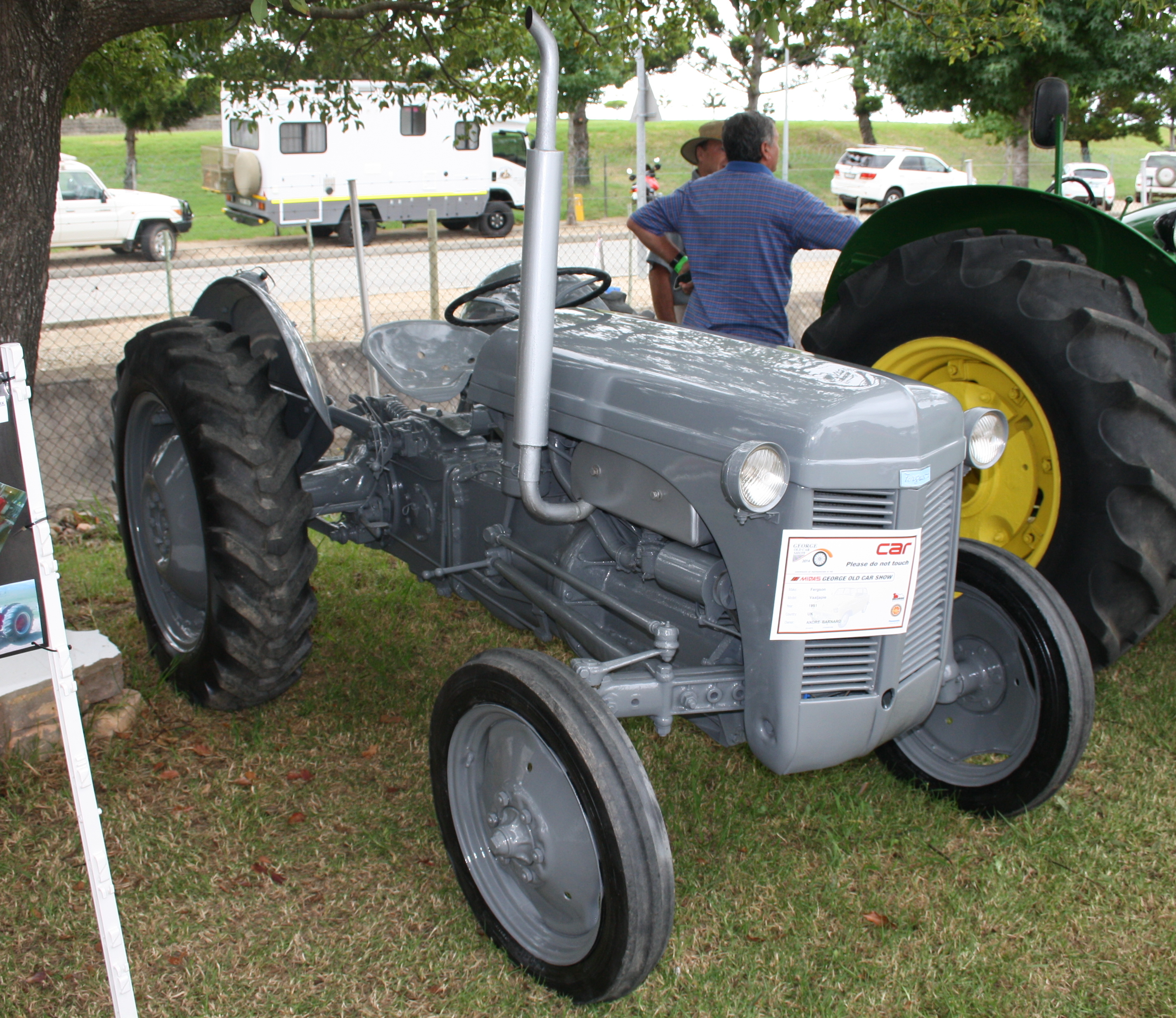
1951 Ferguson

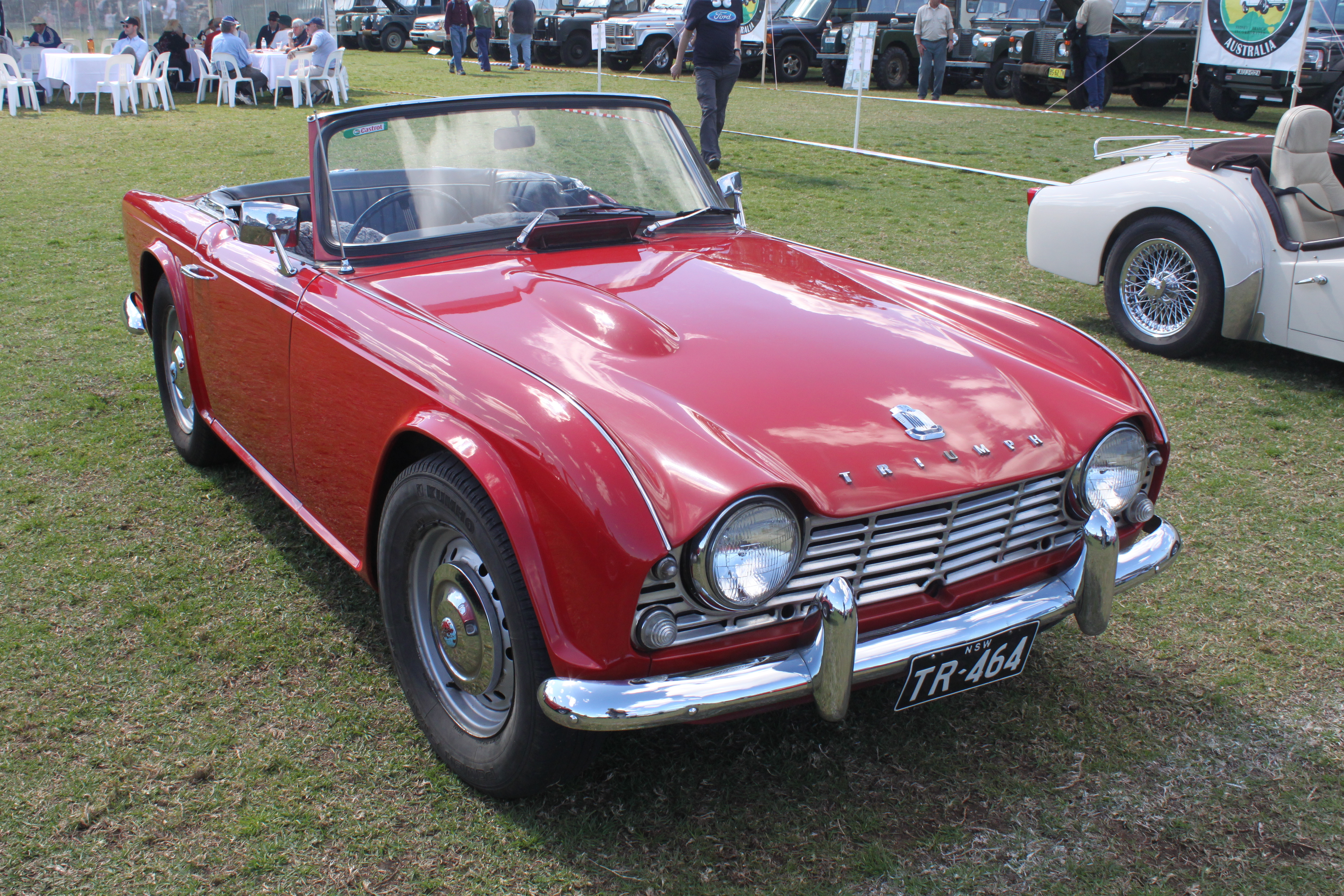
1964 Triumph TR4

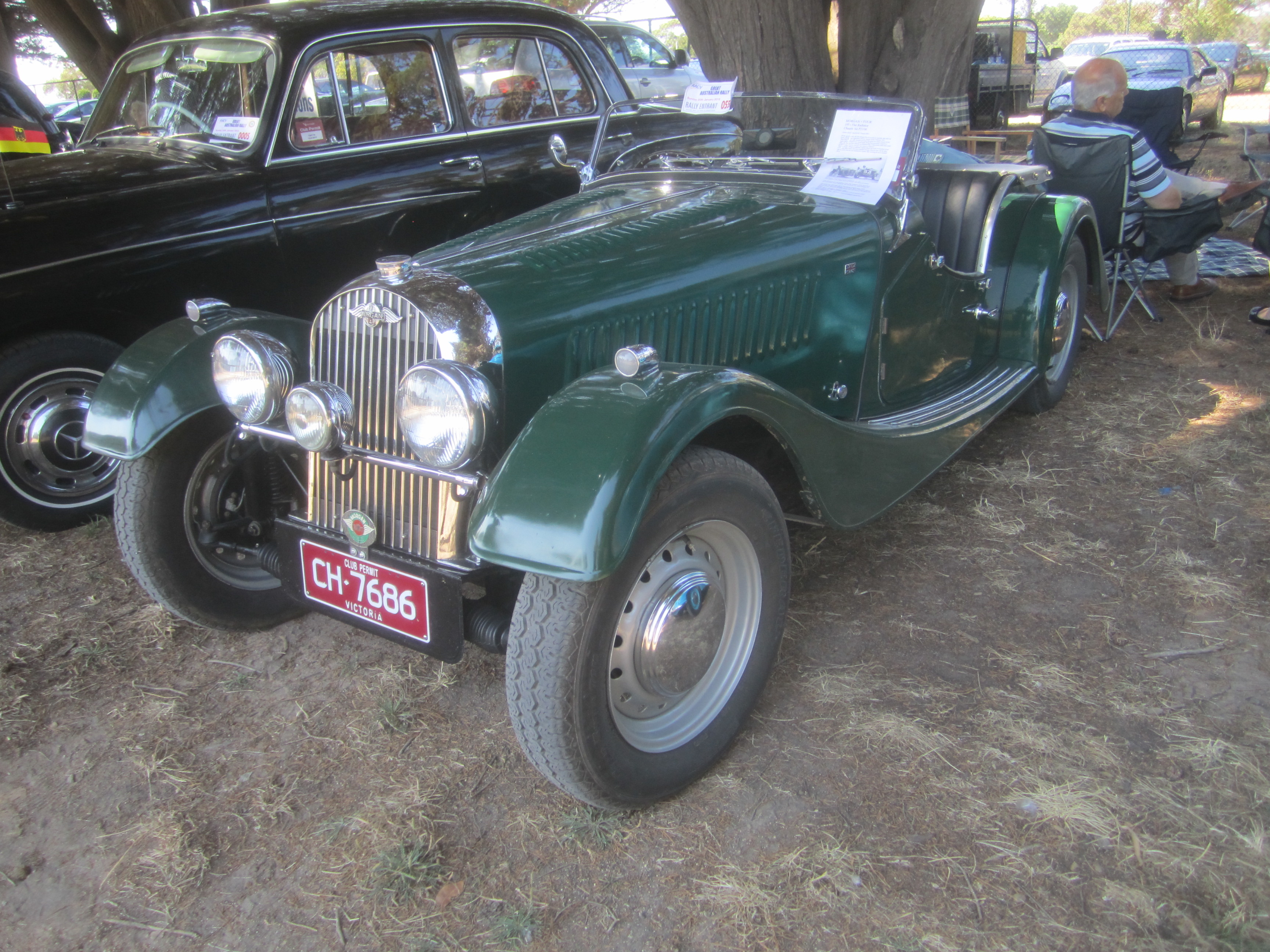
1951 Morgan Plus 4

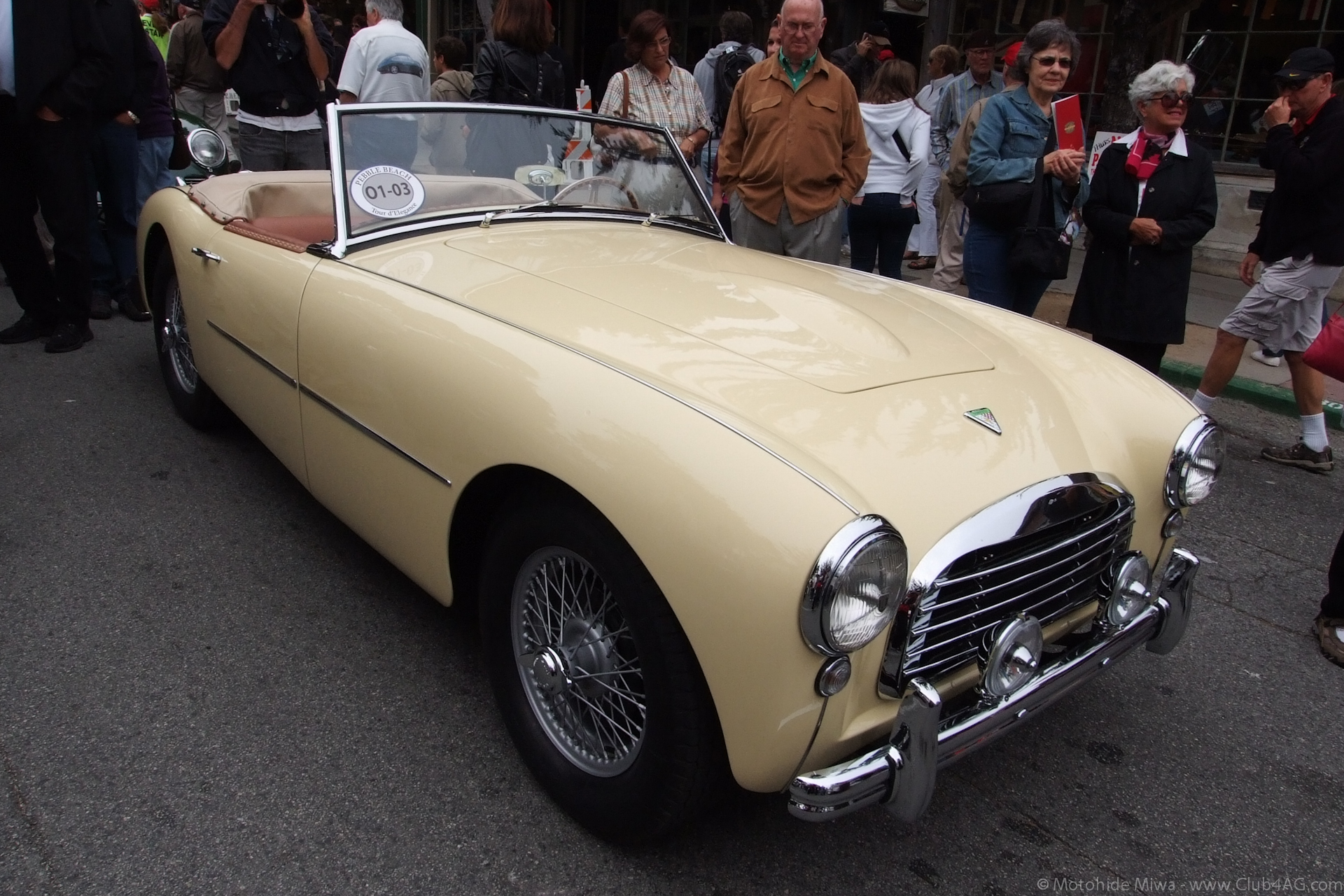
Swallow Doretti

==== Leyland Motors ====
The Standard-Triumph company was eventually bought in 1960 by Leyland Motors which paid £20 million and the last Standard, an Ensign Deluxe, was produced in the UK in May 1963, when the final Vanguard models were replaced by the Triumph 2000 model. Triumph continued when Leyland became British Leyland Motor Corporation (later BL) in 1968 after merger with British Motor Holdings (Austin, Morris etc). The Standard brand was ended on 17 August 1970 when a sudden announcement said that henceforth the company was to be known as the Triumph Motor Company. The Standard name has been unused in Europe since then and the Triumph or Rover Triumph BL subsidiary used the former Standard engineering and production facilities at Canley in Coventry until the plant was closed in 1980.

==== BMW ====
BMW acquired the Standard and Triumph brands following its purchase of BL's successor Rover Group in 1994. When most of Rover was sold in 2000, BMW kept the Standard brand along with Triumph, Mini and Riley. The management of British Motor Heritage, gained the rights to the Standard Brand upon their management purchase of this company from BMW in 2001.

There was talk of a possible revival of the Standard name by MG Rover for its importation of the Tata Indica. However, for reasons relating to the ownership of the brand by BMW, the car was finally launched as the Rover CityRover.

== Standard in India ==
The Standard name had disappeared from Britain during the 1960s but continued for two more decades in India, where Standard Motor Products of India Ltd manufactured the Triumph Herald badged as the 'Standard Herald' and with the basic 948 cc engine during the 1960s, with increasingly local content and design changes over the years, eventually producing additional four-door and five-door estate models exclusively for the Indian market by the late 1960s.

After 1970, Standard Motor Products split with British Leyland, and introduced a bodily restyled four-door saloon based on the Herald known as the Standard Gazel in 1972, using the same 948 cc engine but with a live rear axle, as the Herald's swing-axle was not liked much by Indian buyers and mechanics alike. Allegedly India's first indigenous car, the Gazel was built in small numbers – it has been suggested that it did so to keep its manufacturer's licence – until 1977. With the company concentrating solely on producing commercial vehicles based on the Leyland 20 model, badged as "Standard 20", production of Standard cars ceased until the Standard 2000, a rebadged Rover SD1, was introduced in 1985. The car was higher and had a slightly modified old 1991 cc Standard Vanguard engine, as the company could not procure the licence to use the original Rover engine on this car. Being expensive and outdated it was not successful, apart from the reasons that it had competition from cars with Japanese and other newer, fuel-efficient technology in India. It ceased production in 1988, with the factory in Perungalathur near Chennai also closing its operations at the same time, around the same time that the last examples of the SD1 left British showrooms (production had finished in 1986 but stocks lasted for around two more years). After feeble efforts over successive years to revive the company, the premises were auctioned off in 2006 and Britain's Rimmer Bros. bought up the entire unused stock of SD1 parts. This also signalled the end of the Standard marque.

== British car models ==
Pre World War I
Year	Name	RAC rating	Cubic capacity	Bore & stroke	Valves	Cylinders	Wheelbase	Production
1903	Motor Victoria	6 hp	1006 cc	127 mm × 76 mm (5.0 in × 3.0 in)	side	1	78 in (1,981 mm)	
1904–05	Motor Victoria	12/15 hp	1926 cc	127 mm × 76 mm (5.0 in × 3.0 in)	side	2		
1905		16 hp	3142 cc	100 mm × 100 mm (3.9 in × 3.9 in)	side	4	108 in (2,743 mm)	
1905–08		18/20	4714 cc	100 mm × 100 mm (3.9 in × 3.9 in)	side	6	120 in (3,048 mm)	
1906	Model 8	16/20	3531 cc	102 mm × 108 mm (4.0 in × 4.3 in)	side	4	108 in (2,743 mm) / 120 in (3,048 mm)	
1906	Model 9	24/30	5232 cc	102 mm × 102 mm (4.0 in × 4.0 in)	side	6	120 in (3,048 mm) / 132 in (3,353 mm)	
1906	Model 10	10 hp	631 cc	70 mm × 82 mm (2.8 in × 3.2 in)	side	2	78 in (1,981 mm)	
1906–12	Model 11	50 hp	11734 cc	140 mm × 127 mm (5.5 in × 5.0 in)	side	6	132 in (3,353 mm)	
1906–12	Model 12	50 hp	11734 cc	140 mm × 127 mm (5.5 in × 5.0 in)	side	6	144 in (3,658 mm)	
1907		15 hp	1893 cc	70 mm × 82 mm (2.8 in × 3.2 in)	side	6	87 in (2,210 mm)	
1907–08	Model B	30 hp	5297 cc	102 mm × 108 mm (4.0 in × 4.3 in)	side	6	120 in (3,048 mm)	
1908–11	Model C	40 hp	6167 cc	102 mm × 107 mm (4.0 in × 4.2 in)	side	6	120 in (3,048 mm)	
1908–11	Model D	30 hp	4032 cc	89 mm × 108 mm (3.5 in × 4.3 in)	side	6	120 in (3,048 mm)	
1909–11	Model E	16 hp	2688 cc	89 mm × 108 mm (3.5 in × 4.3 in)	side	4	110 in (2,794 mm) / 120 in (3,048 mm)	
1912	Model G	25 hp	4032 cc	89 mm × 108 mm (3.5 in × 4.3 in)	side	6	116 in (2,946 mm)	
1910–11	Model J	12 hp	1656 cc	68 mm × 114 mm (2.7 in × 4.5 in)	side	4	96 in (2,438 mm)	
1911–12	Model K	15 hp	2368 cc	80 mm × 120 mm (3.1 in × 4.7 in)	side	4	120 in (3,048 mm)	
1911–13	Model L	20 hp	3620 cc	80 mm × 120 mm (3.1 in × 4.7 in)	side	6	126 in (3,200 mm)	
1913–14	Model O	20 hp	3336 cc	89 mm × 133 mm (3.5 in × 5.2 in)	side	4	121 in (3,073 mm) / 128 in (3,251 mm)	
1913–18	Model S	9.5 hp	1087 cc	62 mm × 90 mm (2.4 in × 3.5 in)	side	4	90 in (2,286 mm)	

1919-1939
Year	Type	Engine	Production
1919–21	9.5 hp Model SLS	1328 cc side-valve 4-cylinder	
1921–23	8 hp	1087 cc ohv 4-cylinder	
1921–23	11.6 hp SLO	1598 cc ohv 4-cylinder	
1922–26	13.9 hp SLO-4	1944 cc ohv 4-cylinder	
1923–27	11.4 hp V3	1307 cc ohv 4-cylinder	
1926–28	13.9 hp V4	1944 cc ohv 4-cylinder	
1927–28	18/36 hp	2230 cc ohv 6-cylinder	
1927–30	9 hp	1153 or 1287 cc side-valve 4-cylinder	
1929–33	15 hp	1930 or 2054 cc side-valve 6-cylinder	
1930–33	9.9 hp Big Nine	1287 cc side-valve 4-cylinder	
1931–35	20 hp Envoy	2552 cc side-valve 6-cylinder	
1932–33	Little Nine	1006 cc side-valve 4-cylinder	
1932–33	Little Twelve	1337 cc side-valve 6-cylinder	
1932–33	Big Twelve	1497 cc side-valve 6-cylinder	
1934	12/6	1497 cc side-valve 6-cylinder	
1934–35	10/12 Speed Model	1608 cc side-valve 4-cylinder	
1934–36	Nine	1052 cc side-valve 4-cylinder	
1934–36	Ten	1343 cc side-valve 4-cylinder	
1934–36	Twelve	1608 cc side-valve 4-cylinder	
1934–36	Sixteen	2143 cc side-valve 6-cylinder	
1935–36	Twenty	2664 cc side-valve 6-cylinder	
1937–38	Flying Ten	1267 cc side-valve 4-cylinder	
1937–40	Flying Twelve	1608 cc side-valve 4-cylinder	
1937–40	Flying Nine	1131 cc side-valve 4-cylinder	
1937–40	Flying Light Twelve	1343 cc side-valve 4-cylinder	
1937–40	Flying Fourteen	1608 cc or 1776 cc side-valve 4-cylinder	
1936–40	Flying Sixteen	2143 cc side-valve 6-cylinder	
1936–40	Flying Twenty	2663 cc side-valve 6-cylinder	
1936–38	Flying V8	2686 cc side-valve V-8-cylinder	
1938–40	Flying Eight	1021 cc side-valve 4-cylinder	

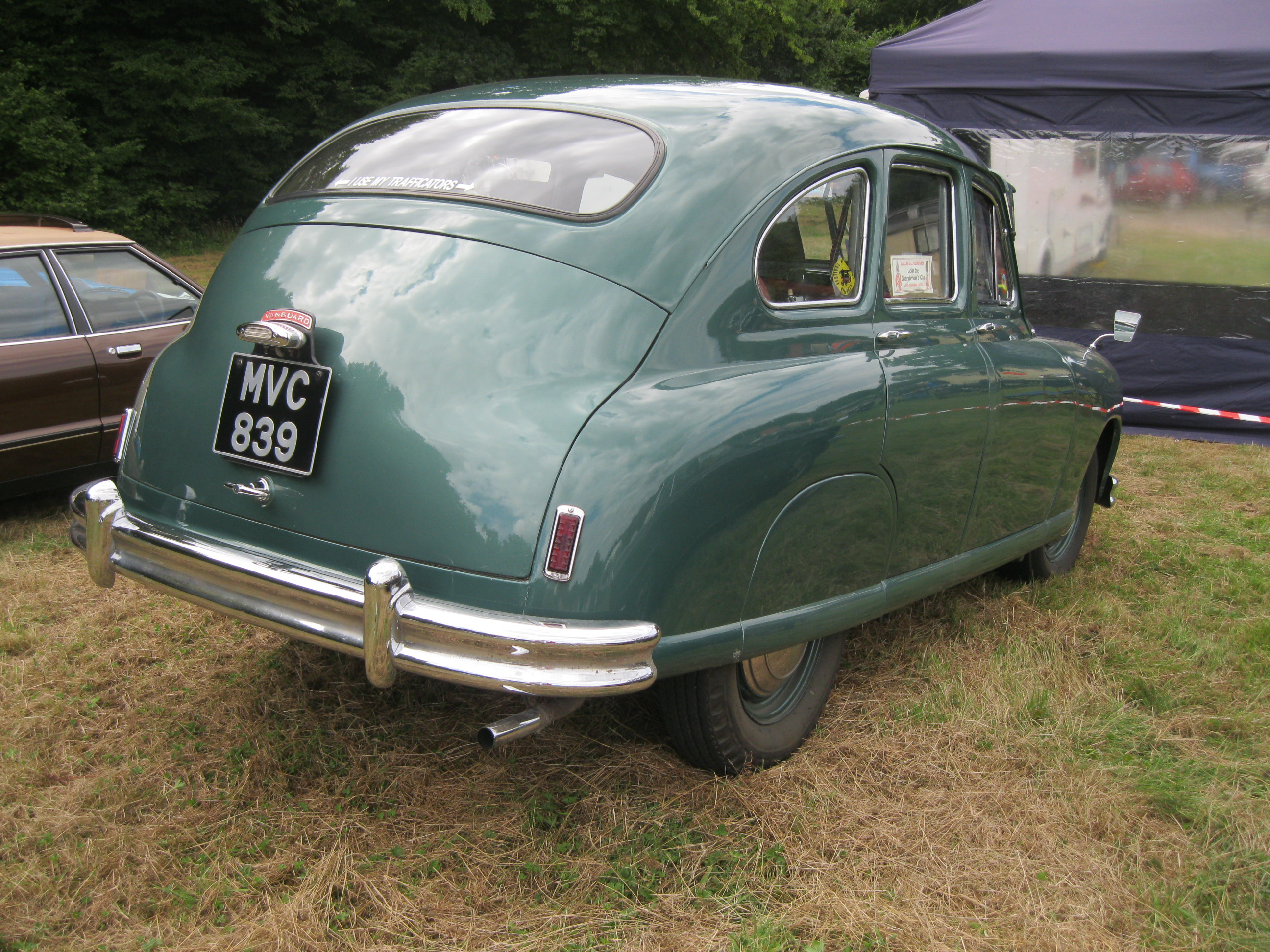
Vanguard Phase I

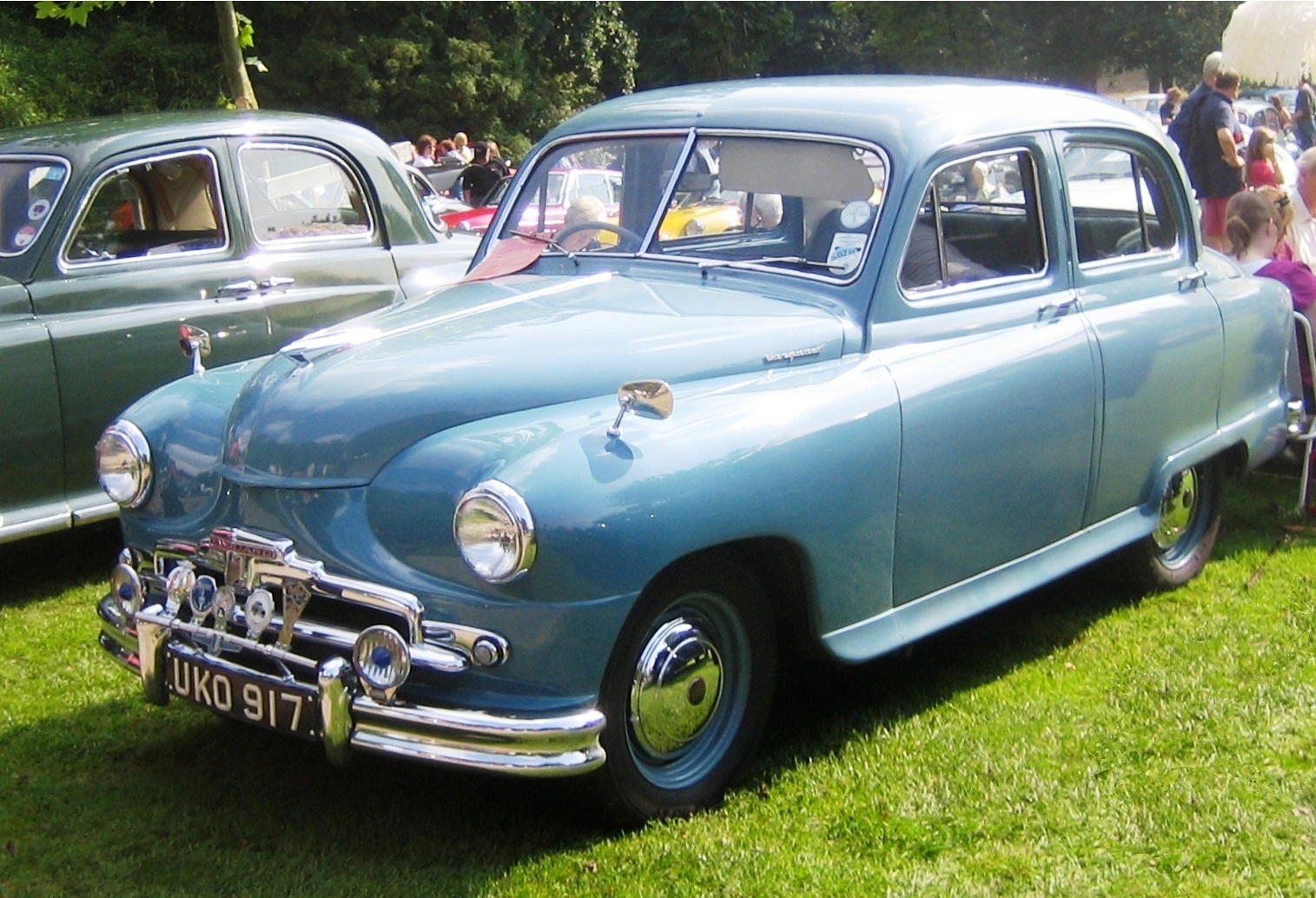
Vanguard Phase II

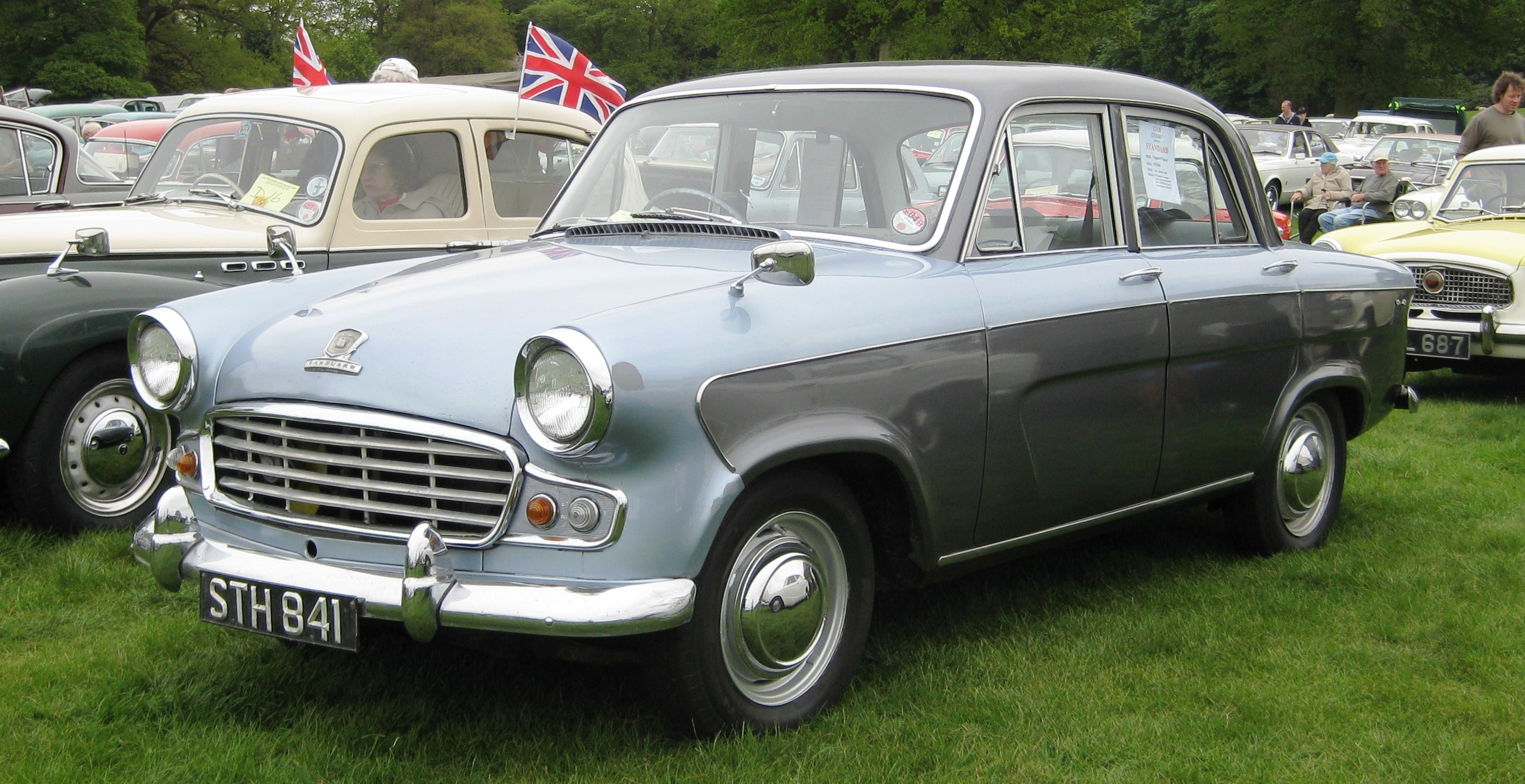
Vanguard Vignale

1945–63
Year	Type	Engine	Production
1945–48	Eight	1021 cc side-valve four-cylinder	53,099
1945–48	Twelve	1608 cc side-valve 4-cylinder	9,959
1945–48	Fourteen	1776 cc side-valve 4-cylinder	22,229
1947–53	Vanguard Phase I	2088 cc OHV 4-cylinder	184,799
1953–55	Vanguard Phase II	2088 cc ohv 4-cylinder 2092 cc ohv 4-cylinder diesel	81,074; 1,973
1953–57	Eight	803 cc ohv 4-cylinder	136,317
1954–56	Ten	948 cc ohv 4-cylinder	172,500
1955–58	Vanguard Phase III	2088 cc ohv 4-cylinder	37,194
1956–57	Vanguard Sportsman	2088 cc ohv 4-cylinder	901
1957–61	Ensign	1670 cc ohv 4-cylinder 2092 cc ohv 4-cylinder diesel	18,852
1957–59	Pennant	948 cc ohv 4-cylinder	42,910
1958–61	Vanguard Vignale	2088 cc ohv 4-cylinder	26,276
1960–63	Vanguard Six	1998 cc ohv 6-cylinder	9,953
1962–63	Ensign II	2138 cc ohv 4-cylinder	2,318

=== Military and commercial ===
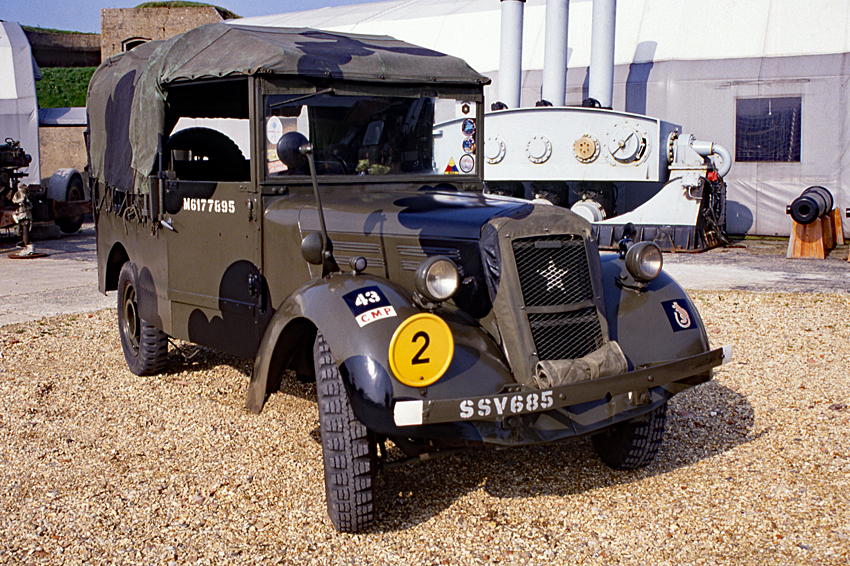
Standard 12 hp Light Utility

Year	Type	Engine	Production
1940–43	Beaverette	1,776 cc side-valve 4-cylinder	
1940-43 type CD; 1943-45 type UV	12 hp Light Utility	1,608 cc side-valve 4-cylinder	
1943	Jeep	1,608 cc side-valve 4-cylinder	
1947–58	12 cwt	2,088 cc ohv 4-cylinder	
1954–62	6 cwt	948 cc ohv 4-cylinder	
1958–62	10 hp Atlas	948 cc ohv 4-cylinder	
1962–63	Atlas Major	1,670 cc ohv 4-cylinder	
1962–65	7 cwt	1,147 cc ohv 4-cylinder	

== See also ==
- Australian Motor Industries
- List of car manufacturers of the United Kingdom
