= Triumph 20TS =

Overview
- Manufacturer: Triumph Motor Company (1945)
- Also called: Triumph Renown sports version Triumph TR1
- Production: 1952; one prototype

Body and chassis
- Class: Sports car
- Body style: Open two-seater
- Layout: FR
- Related: Triumph TR2

Powertrain
- Engine: 1991 cc Standard wet liner inline-four engine, two SU carburettors; 75 hp (56 kW) at 4500 rpm

Dimensions
- Wheelbase: 2,311 mm (91 in)
- Length: 3,581 mm (141 in)
- Width: 1,410 mm (55.5 in)
- Kerb weight: 775 kg (1,708 lb)

Chronology
- Predecessor: Triumph Roadster; Triumph TR-X
- Successor: Triumph TR2

The Triumph 20TS was a prototype sports car shown by Standard-Triumph in October 1952 at the London Motor Show. Extensive development of the 20TS led to the introduction of the Triumph TR2 in March 1953 at the Geneva Motor Show, after which the 20TS was unofficially referred to as the Triumph TR1. Only one example of this car was ever made by Triumph.

== History ==
The 20TS was shown to the public in October 1952 at the London Motor Show at Earls Court. Reactions to the 20TS were mixed. Criticisms included a tight interior and lack of boot space.

To get an opinion of the car's performance and handling at speed, Standard-Triumph chairman Sir John Black invited BRM development engineer and test driver Ken Richardson to drive it. Richardson had a low opinion of the 20TS's performance and handling, describing it as a "death-trap" with poor handling and a top speed of 80 mph (129 km/h), short of Black's target of 90 mph (145 km/h):

Frankly, I think it's the most bloody awful car I've ever driven.

— Ken Richardson, BRM test driver, to Sir John Black, chairman of Standard-Triumph.

Upon hearing Richardson's assessment, Black asked him to help redesign the car. Richardson tuned and modified the engine and worked with Triumph engineers to increase the brake size, modify the front suspension, and experiment with rear springs and shocks. A stronger frame with improved torsional rigidity was designed. Meanwhile, the stylists widened and lengthened the car for more interior room and boot space, mounting the spare wheel inside the boot. The result was the Triumph TR2, introduced in March 1953 at the Geneva Motor Show.

== Features ==
The 20TS was very much a parts bin special, built using existing components. Its engine was the Standard wet liner inline-four engine, similar to that in the Standard Vanguard but with liners that reduced bore to 83 mm and displacement to 1991 cc. Its suspension was from the Triumph Mayflower, and its chassis from the Standard 8 hp, itself based on the pre-war Standard Flying Nine.

The body was designed to be built economically, with no panels requiring double-action presswork. Economy of design was considered vital, as the company did not expect high sales figures and had targeted a price of £500 before sales tax. The rear of the car was short and curved and had the spare tyre bolted to it.

== Legacy ==
The 20TS was the origin of the Triumph TR sports car line, and was referred to unofficially as the TR1 after the introduction of the TR2.

It is unknown whether the 20TS exists today. According to Bill Piggott, the car might have been scrapped to provide parts for a TR2 prototype.
