= Triumph 1800 =

Triumph 1800 may refer to one of the following Triumph automobiles:

- A predecessor of the Triumph Renown Saloon
- A variant of the Triumph Roadster
