= Triumph TR-X =

British prototype concept car by Triumph

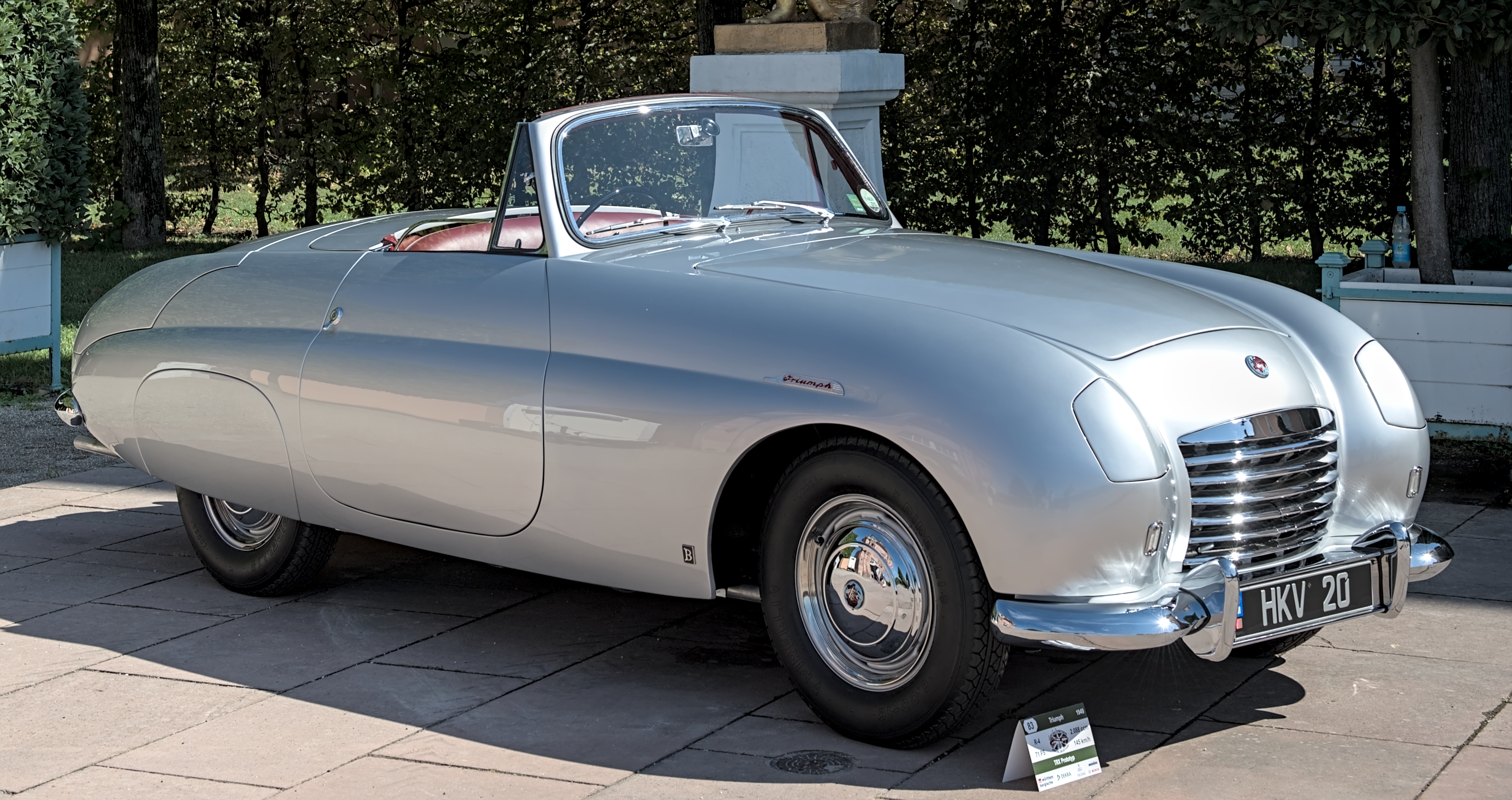

Overview
- Manufacturer: Triumph Motor Company (1945) Limited
- Also called: Triumph Roadster; Silver Bullet; Bullet
- Production: 1950; three prototypes
- Designer: Walter Belgrove

Body and chassis
- Class: Personal luxury car
- Body style: Drophead coupé
- Layout: FR
- Platform: Standard Vanguard
- Related: Standard Vanguard; Triumph Renown

Powertrain
- Engine: 2.1 L (2,088 cc) Standard wet liner I4 (petrol)
- Transmission: 3-speed manual with overdrive

Dimensions
- Wheelbase: 2,387.6 mm (94 in)
- Length: 4,216.4 mm (166 in)
- Width: 1,778.0 mm (70 in)
- Kerb weight: 1,168 kg (23 long cwt)

Chronology
- Predecessor: Triumph Roadster
- Successor: Triumph 20TS

Triumph TR-X is the name given to a series of prototype concept cars built by the Triumph Motor Company. First shown in 1950, it was the first Triumph automobile to be called a "TR", but was a much more luxurious car than the roadsters that followed. It also incorporated a number of powered accessories and features. The TR-X did not reach production.

== History ==
Triumph's earliest printed material from the period called it the Triumph Roadster. The car was later named the TR-X, for TRiumph eXperimental. It was also known as the "Silver Bullet", or simply the "Bullet".^{Note 1} The TR-X was the first Triumph car to use the TR designation.

Its public debut took place at the Paris Auto Show in early October 1950, and its second appearance was at the British International Motor Show at Earls Court Exhibition Centre later that same month.

The car was equipped with an elaborate electro-hydraulic servosystem, engineered by Leslie Ireland, that powered a number of convenience features in the car. Some of these systems failed while being demonstrated to Princess Margaret, Countess of Snowdon.

Triumph's traditional body panel suppliers, Fisher and Ludlow and Mulliners, were not equipped to press the aluminium sheet used in the TR-X body, and declined to build bodies for the TR-X. Negotiations with Italian firms Carrozzeria Touring and Pininfarina also came to naught. Triumph sourced the panels for the three prototypes from Helliwells Ltd.

The minimum cost to produce the TR-X was calculated to have been £975, and a production version would have been the most expensive model in the Standard-Triumph lineup. Standard could not manufacture a car as complicated as the TR-X and sell it at a profit. The car would have been uncompetitive in both performance and price against the Jaguar XK120. Material shortages caused by the Korean War also impeded plans to bring the TR-X to market.

Development of the TR-X was discontinued after three prototypes had been built. Two cars were completed in time to display at Earls Court. A third body was produced, but was never mounted to a chassis, leaving the third car unfinished. The two completed cars, registered as HKV 20 and KHP 712, were sold. As of December 2025 these two survive. The unfinished car was reportedly destroyed in a fire.

== Features ==
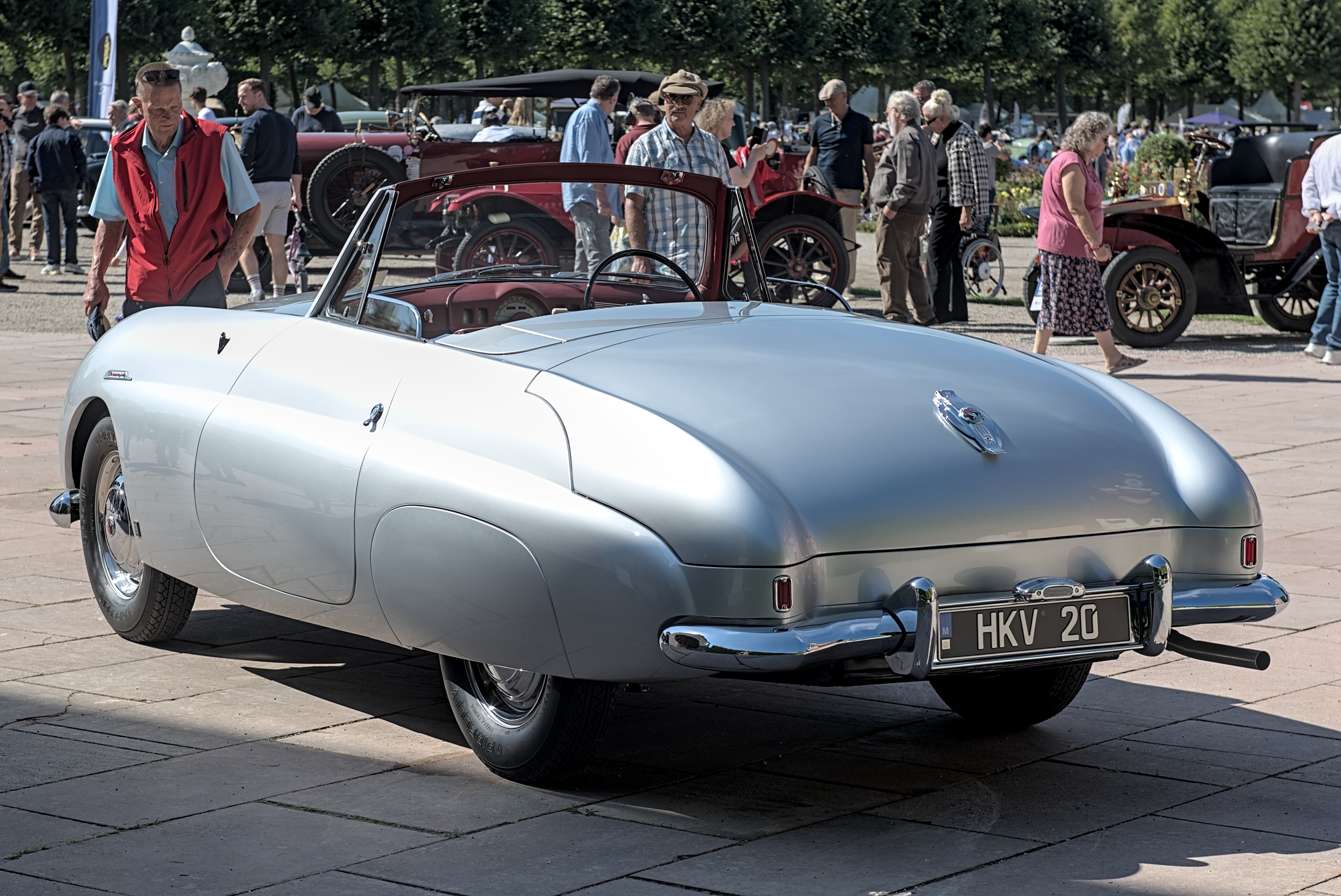
Rear view

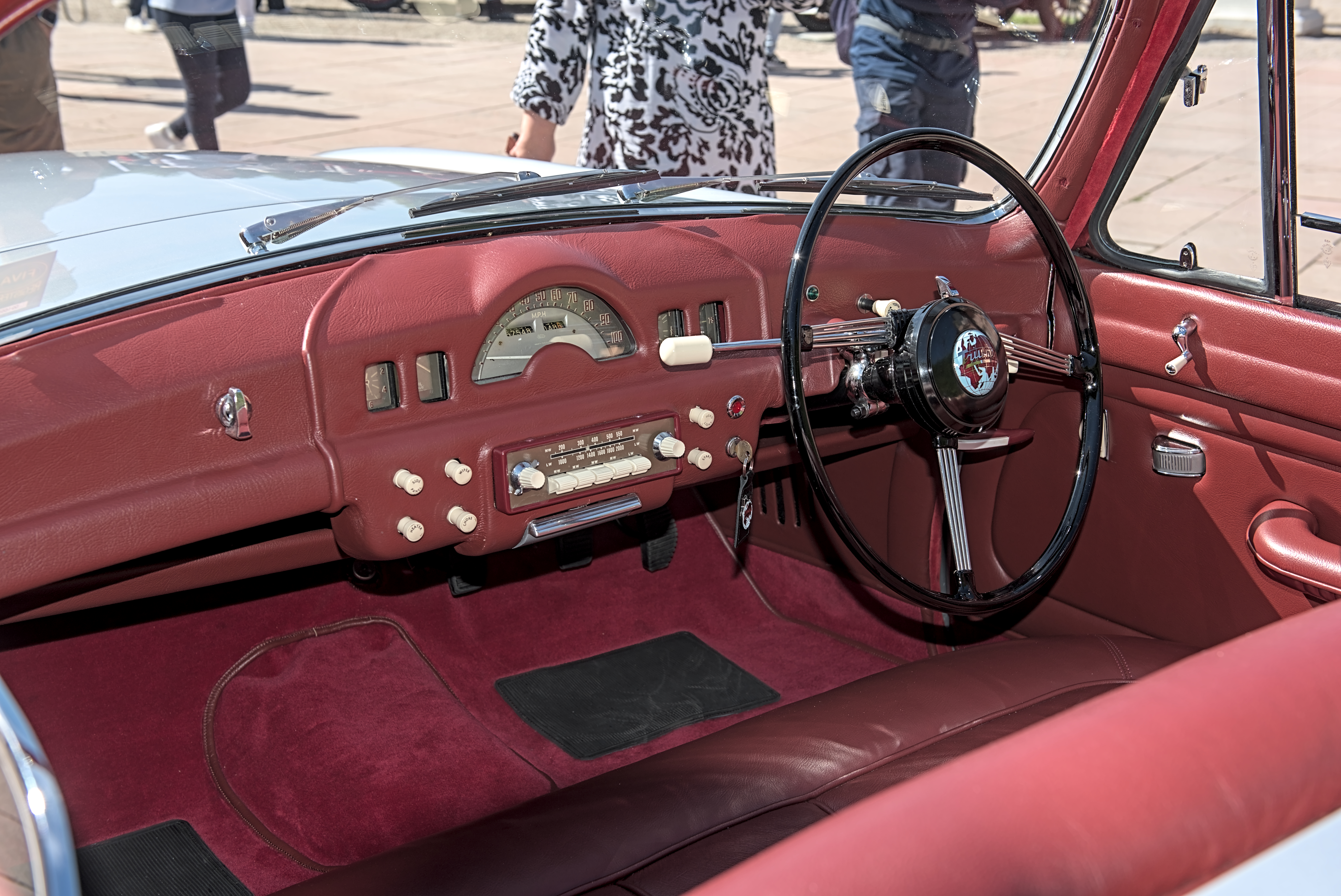
Interior

Envisioned as a personal luxury car, the TR-X has envelope styling with a double-skinned aluminium body, spats over the rear wheels, and a bonnet that may be opened to the left or right. The curved windscreen is made of Triplex safety glass, and the car also has blinking turn signal indicators. One feature that gave reviewers pause was the location of the petrol tank, situated so far in the rear of the car that it seemed to present a risk of puncture and fire in the event of a rear-end collision.

Convenience features include electro-hydraulically operated bench seat, windows, and hood, onboard hydraulic jacks, electrically operated headlamp shutters, and a radio with power aerial. Some of the car's network of wires and hydraulic lines is hidden in the space between the inner and outer body panels.

The TR-X uses the Standard Vanguard's 94-inch (2,388 mm) wheelbase chassis. The chassis was determined to be too narrow for the application, and was modified and lightened. The suspension is from the Triumph Renown.

The engine is the same 2088 cc Standard wet liner inline-four engine used in the Vanguard, but with compression raised to 7.0:1 and two SU carburettors in place of the Vanguard's one. The first car received a new aluminium crossflow cylinder head, while the second got the Standard cast-iron piece. The transmission is a 3-speed manual, with a Laycock de Normanville electrically operated overdrive. Top speed was estimated to be 90 mph (140 km/h)

== Technical data ==
Triumph TR-X	Detail:
Engine:	Standard wet liner inline-four engine
Bore × Stroke:	85 mm × 92 mm (3.346 in × 3.622 in)
Displacement:	2,088 cc (127.4 cu in)
Maximum power:	71 bhp (53 kW) at 4,200 rpm
Maximum torque:	108 ft⋅lb (146 N⋅m) at 2,000 rpm
Compression ratio:	7.0:1
Valvetrain:	Single cam-in-block, pushrods, rocker arms, 2 overhead valves per cylinder
Induction:	Two SU carburettors
Cooling:	Water-cooled
Transmission:	3-speed manual with overdrive
Final drive ratio:	Not available
Steering:	Marles steering gear
Brakes f/r:	11-inch (279 mm) Lockheed hydraulic drum brakes
Suspension front:	Wishbones and coil springs, Armstrong telescopic dampers
Suspension rear:	Semi-elliptic leaf springs, anti-roll bar, Armstrong telescopic dampers
Body/Chassis:	Steel body on steel ladder chassis with central cruciform bracing
Track f/r:	51 / 54 in (1,295 / 1,372 mm)
Wheelbase:	94 in (2,388 mm)
Tyres:	5.50 × 15
Length; Width; Height:	155 in (3,937 mm); 70 in (1,778 mm); 55 in (1,397 mm)
Weight:	2,716 lb (1,232 kg)
Fuel consumption:	22–24 mpg_{‑imp} (13–12 L/100 km; 18–20 mpg_{‑US})
Maximum speed:	90 mph (145 km/h)

== Notes ==
Note 1 In the late 1960s, Triumph began work on a replacement for the TR6. By the early 1970s, the project had produced a new Targa top prototype formally called the Bullet, with a target release date of 1975. This Bullet did not reach production.
