= Helliwells Ltd =

British engineering company (1889–2011)

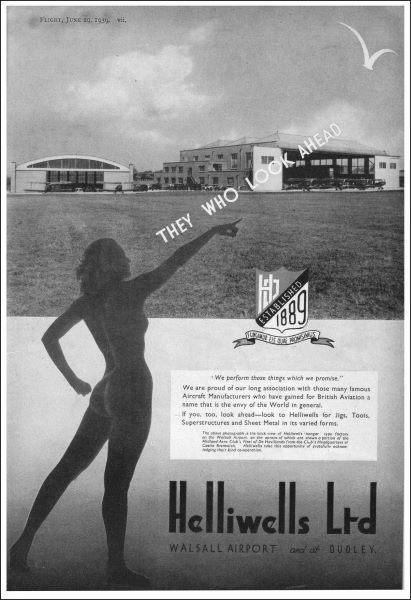
Advertisement in Flight magazine, June 1939

Helliwells Ltd was a British engineering company. The company was founded in Dudley, Worcestershire, in 1889 as a manufacturer of fireplace accessories. It branched out into the automotive and aerospace sectors as these experienced growth in the early 20th century. In 1939 it established a factory at Walsall Aerodrome, which it used during the Second World War to adapt the American-made A-20 Havoc/Boston to British standards and to refurbish Spitfire, Seafire and Harvard aircraft.

In the post-war years, Helliwells purchased Swallow Coachbuilding and from 1946 to 1951 produced the Swallow Gadabout motor scooter and prototypes of the Triumph TR-X motor car. Helliwells was purchased by Tube Investments Group in 1950, and from 1954 to 1955 produced the Swallow Doretti luxury motor car. Helliwells was renamed TI Hollow Extrusions in 1985 and, after its sale to the former managing director of Reynolds Tube, was known as Hay Hall Tyseley. The company was dissolved in 2011.

== History ==
=== Origins ===
A 1920 advertisement featuring fireplace accessories

Helliwells was established in 1889 at Fountain Street, Dudley, in the Black Country and was originally a manufacturer of fire irons and fireguards; the company was first registered on 26 June 1899. With the growth of the motor car industry the company branched out into folded metalwork for windscreen frames. By the late 1930s, with the expansion of the Royal Air Force, it had entered the aerospace industry as a manufacturer of windscreens and cabin tops. To further its ambitions in this sector it negotiated permission from the Walsall Corporation to lease land at Walsall Aerodrome for construction of a factory. This was completed by 1939, by which time Helliwells had offices, a store and a tool shop at Fountain Street, Dudley, a 3-storey factory at Oakeywell Street, Dudley, additional offices in Walsall and the new works at Walsall Airport where it hoped to consolidate all its operations.

=== Second World War ===
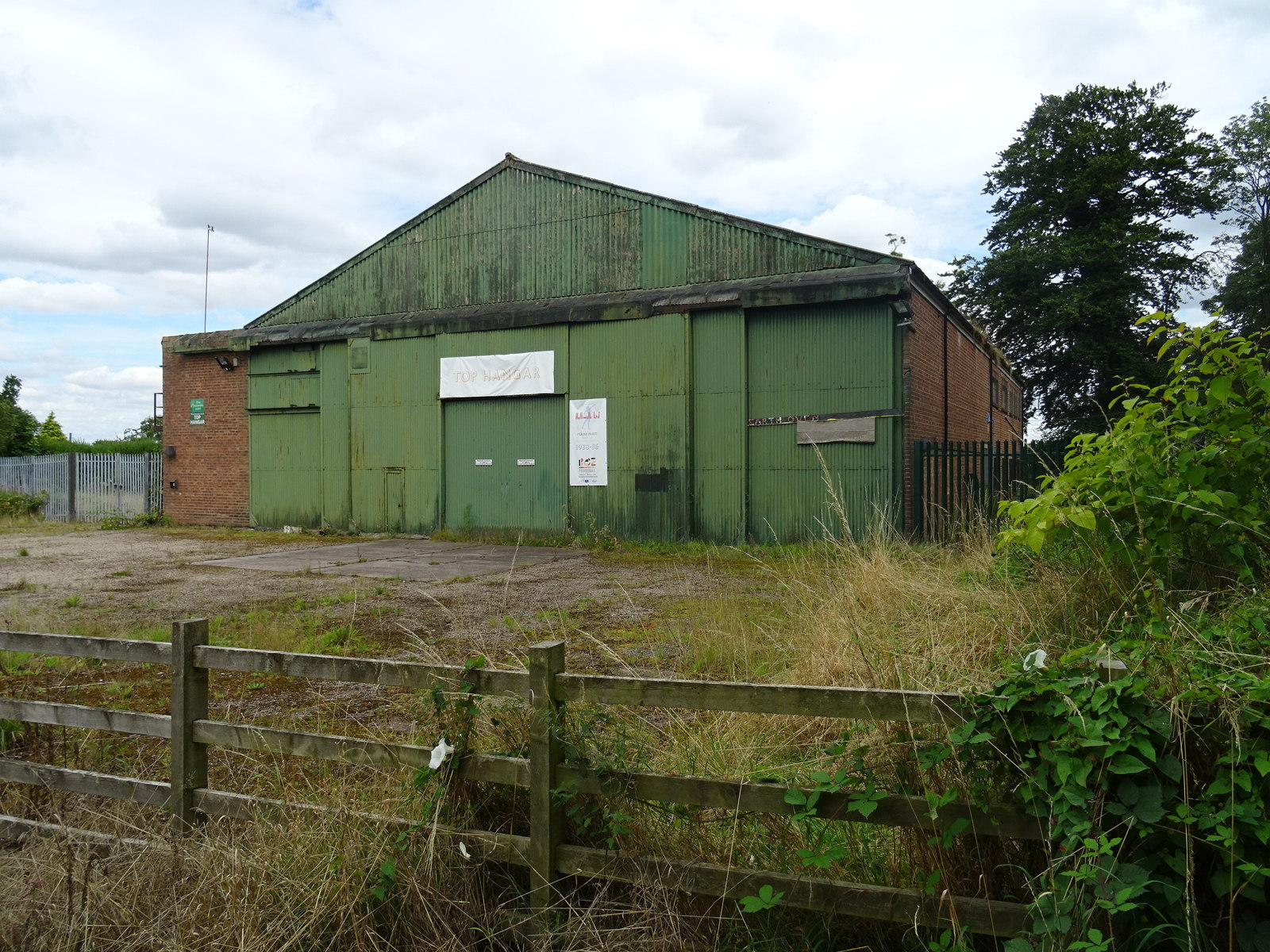
Top Hangar at Walsall Aerodrome, with sign reading "Helliwells Ltd Plane Parts 1938-56"

During the Second World War Helliwells was designated as a British "sister" firm of the American Douglas Aircraft Company. Helliwells worked to adapt Douglas' A-20 Havoc/Boston aircraft to British standards and to install additional equipment for service with the Royal Air Force. In this role Helliwells initially worked under the direction of a technical committee at British manufacturer Boulton Paul Aircraft, but from 4 June 1943 worked under its own technical committee. Helliwells also had government contracts to refurbish and overhaul Boston aircraft as well as Supermarine's Spitfire and Seafire and North American Aviation's Harvard in British service.

During this period Eric Sanders, of Dudley-based windscreen company Pearce & Sanders, became managing director and later owner of the company. He oversaw its transition from domestic supplier to aerospace sub-contractor and its expansion to five factories at Dudley, Walsall and Kings Norton in the West Midlands and in South Wales, employing 5,000 people.

=== Post-war diversification ===
Shortly after the war Helliwells purchased Swallow Coachbuilding from William Lyons' Jaguar Cars and moved manufacture of Swallow Sidecars to Walsall. From 1946 they produced the Swallow Gadabout motor scooter to try to take advantage of an emerging market for cheap scooters. The scooter was designed by Helliwells' chief designer, Frank Rainbow, and was based on the folding Welbike used by British airborne forces during the war. It had a 125cc 2-stroke Villiers Engineering engine. The Gadabout was marketed as the "British Two-wheeler for Mr & Mrs Everyman" and saw service with Staffordshire County Police. A Mark II Gadabout was released in 1949, which remained in production until September 1951, by which time around 2,000 had been manufactured. A follow-up model, named the Joyrider was designed but never made.

In 1947 Helliwells announced they were going to manufacture the Globe GC-1 Swift light aircraft, under licence as the Helliwell Globe but this did not materialise. During the late 1940s the chairman of Standard-Triumph John Black asked Helliwells to build three prototypes of his company's Triumph TR-X motor car. Black considered he owed Helliwells a favour for assistance the company had provided to his firm during the war and provided the work as a means of paying them back. Production was slow as Helliwells were not used to motor cars and the prototypes were not completed ahead of the 1949 motor shows they were meant to debut at. The models first appeared at the Paris motor show in 1950 but, despite favourable reviews, did not progress into production and was cancelled in 1951. Two of the three prototypes survive.

Helliwells was sold by Sanders to Tube Investments Group in 1950 and continued as a subsidiary of that firm. From April 1951 Helliwells had a contract to maintain, overhaul and modify the fleet of the Civil Aviation Flying Unit which included de Havilland Tiger Moths, de Havilland Canada DHC-1 Chipmunks, Auster Aircraft, Airspeed Consuls, Avro 19s and a Miles Gemini.

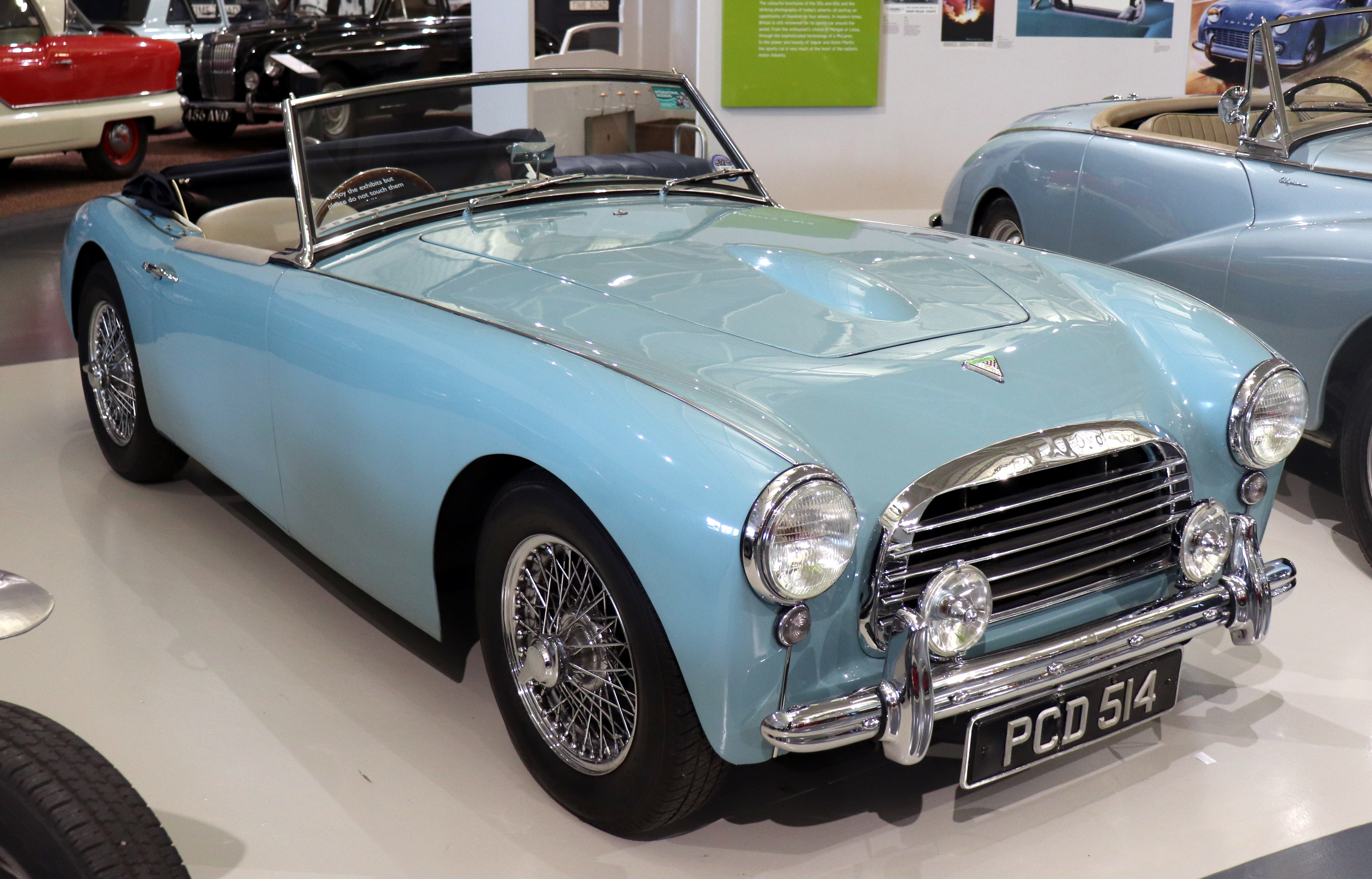
The Swallow Doretti

In the early 1950s Helliwells management identified demand for a British-style sports car in the American market and looked to develop a vehicle to meet this. The resulting Swallow Doretti was based on a 2-litre, 4-cylinder Triumph TR2 engine. A tubular chassis was used, making the most of in-house manufacturing capabilities. A high-quality look was achieved with thick carpets and luxury upholstery. The Doretti debuted at the 1953 London Motorfair with contemporary reviews remarking that it handled better than the TR2. Sales were launched at the 1954 Earls Court Motor Show with a list price of £777 (plus £324 purchase tax) and an overdrive option available for an addition £56. This pricing compared unfavourably with the TR2 which was available from £910. Helliwell's Walsall plant produced 276 Dorettis in 1954 and 1955. A mark 2 version, to be known as Sabre, was proposed but not progressed.

=== Later history ===
The company was renamed to TI Helliwells in 1977, to TI Hollow Extrusions in 1985 and to Hollow Extrusions in 1990. From 2000 it was named Hay Hall Tyseley, after Hay Hall, Birmingham, which until 1998 was occupied by Reynolds Tube, another subsidiary of TI Group. Hollow Extrusions had been sold by TI in a management buyout to the former managing director of Reynolds. The company was dissolved in 2011.
