= Triumph Mayflower =

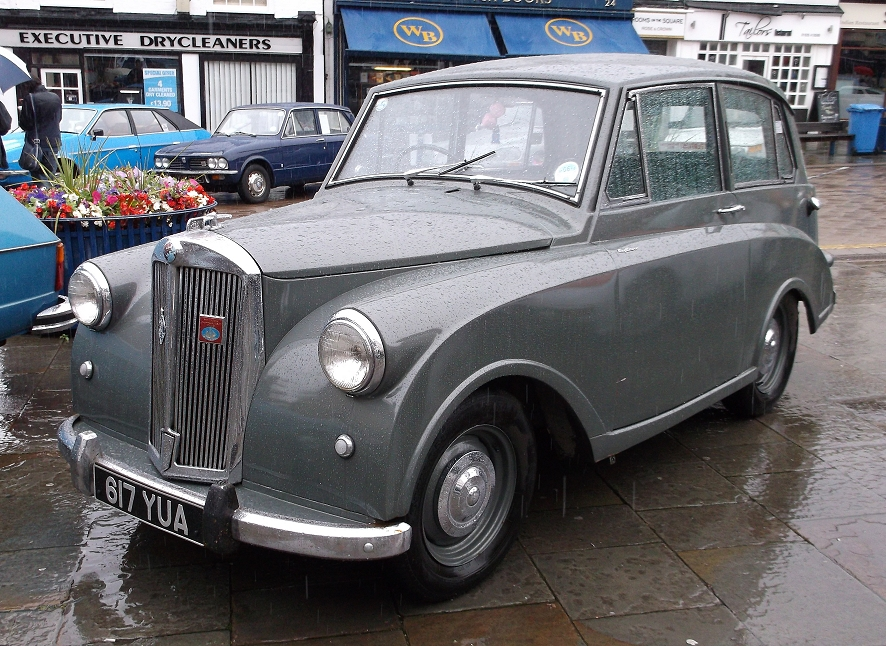

Overview
- Manufacturer: Standard Motor Company
- Production: 1949–1953; 35,000 made
- Assembly: United Kingdom: Coventry; Australia: Port Melbourne; Sweden: Nyköping (ANA)

Body and chassis
- Body style: 2-door saloon 2-door drophead coupé 2-door coupé utility (Australia)

Powertrain
- Engine: 1,247 cc (76.1 cu in) side-valve I4
- Transmission: 3-speed manual

Dimensions
- Wheelbase: 84 in (2,134 mm)
- Length: 156 in (3,962 mm)
- Width: 62 in (1,575 mm)
- Height: 60 in (1,524 mm)

Chronology
- Successor: Standard 8/Triumph Herald

The Triumph Mayflower is a small, upscale family car built from 1949 until 1953 by the British Standard Motor Company and sold by their Triumph Motor Company subsidiary. It has a 1 1/4-litre engine and was noted for its razor-edge styling. It was announced at the October 1949 British International Motor Show, but deliveries did not commence until the middle of 1950.

One of the nine prototype Triumph Mayflowers, "X488", was factory tested 5000 miles across Europe in 1950, where they used the famous rooftop test track of Impéria Automobiles in Belgium.

The Mayflower's "upscale small car" position did not find a ready market, and sales did not meet Standard's expectations. The company's next small car, the Standard Eight of 1953, was a basic 0.8-litre economy car.

== Design and engineering ==
The Mayflower used a version of the pre-war Standard Flying Ten's side-valve engine updated with an aluminium cylinder head and single Solex carburettor. The engine developed 38 bhp (28 kW) at 4200 rpm. The 3-speed gearbox, with column shift, came from the Standard Vanguard and had synchromesh on all the forward ratios. There was independent suspension at the front using coil springs and telescopic dampers, but a solid axle with semi-elliptic leaf springs, also based on the Vanguard's design, was at the rear. Lockheed hydraulic brakes were fitted.

The Mayflower was the first car with unitary construction to be manufactured either by Standard or by the Triumph company that existed before Standard bought its assets. The body was designed by Leslie Moore, chief body designer of Mulliners of Birmingham with input from Standard's Walter Belgrove. The body shells were built by Fisher and Ludlow at Castle Bromwich, Birmingham.

The Mayflower had traditional "razor edge" styling similar to that of the Triumph Renown, imitating the style then still used by Bentley and Rolls-Royce cars. Standard's managing director Sir John Black believed this would be especially appealing to the American market. One advantage of the car's upright styling was that it could seat four people in comfort despite its small size, although there were complaints about the rear seat being constrained by the rear axle and being too narrow as a result.

=== Non-saloon versions ===
Triumph Mayflower Coupe Utility (Ute), Sydney, 1953

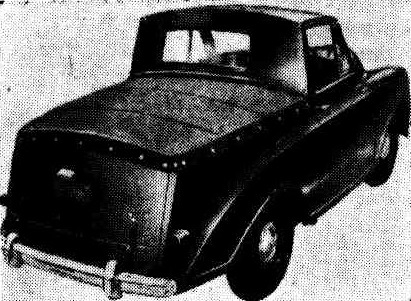
Triumph Mayflower Utility

Ten drophead coupés were built in 1950.

Standard Motor Company (Australia) Limited produced a coupé utility variant of the Mayflower at their Port Melbourne plant in Victoria, Australia. 150 examples were built from Mayflower Saloon CKD kits imported from the United Kingdom, with bodywork locally modified to form a rear load area to which a timber floor and side panels were added. The Utility was introduced in 1952.

== Performance ==
A Mayflower tested at Brooklands racing circuit, by British magazine The Motor in 1950 had a top speed of 62.9 mph (101.2 km/h) and could accelerate from 0–50 mph (80 km/h) in 26.6 seconds. A fuel consumption of 28.3 miles per imperial gallon (10.0 L/100 km; 23.6 mpg_{‑US}) was recorded.

== Pricing ==
The Motor's test car cost £505 including taxes. The 1250 cc, 914 kg Mayflower was in a different market from the same year's 803 cc, 775 kg, less well equipped and more aggressively priced Morris Minor advertised at £382. The MSRP in the US was $1750, more than the $1629 asked for a basic 2-door Chevrolet and almost 80% more than a similarly sized, powered and engineered Ford Anglia offered at a rock-bottom $948.

== Reception ==
The Mayflower was announced and displayed for the first time on 28 September 1949, the first day of the Earls Court Motor Show. Deliveries, including complete knock down (CKD) kits for overseas markets, began in the middle of 1950.

Despite its low performance, the Mayflower impressed automobile testers, including Tom McCahill from Mechanix Illustrated and The Scribe from Autocar.

== Legacy ==
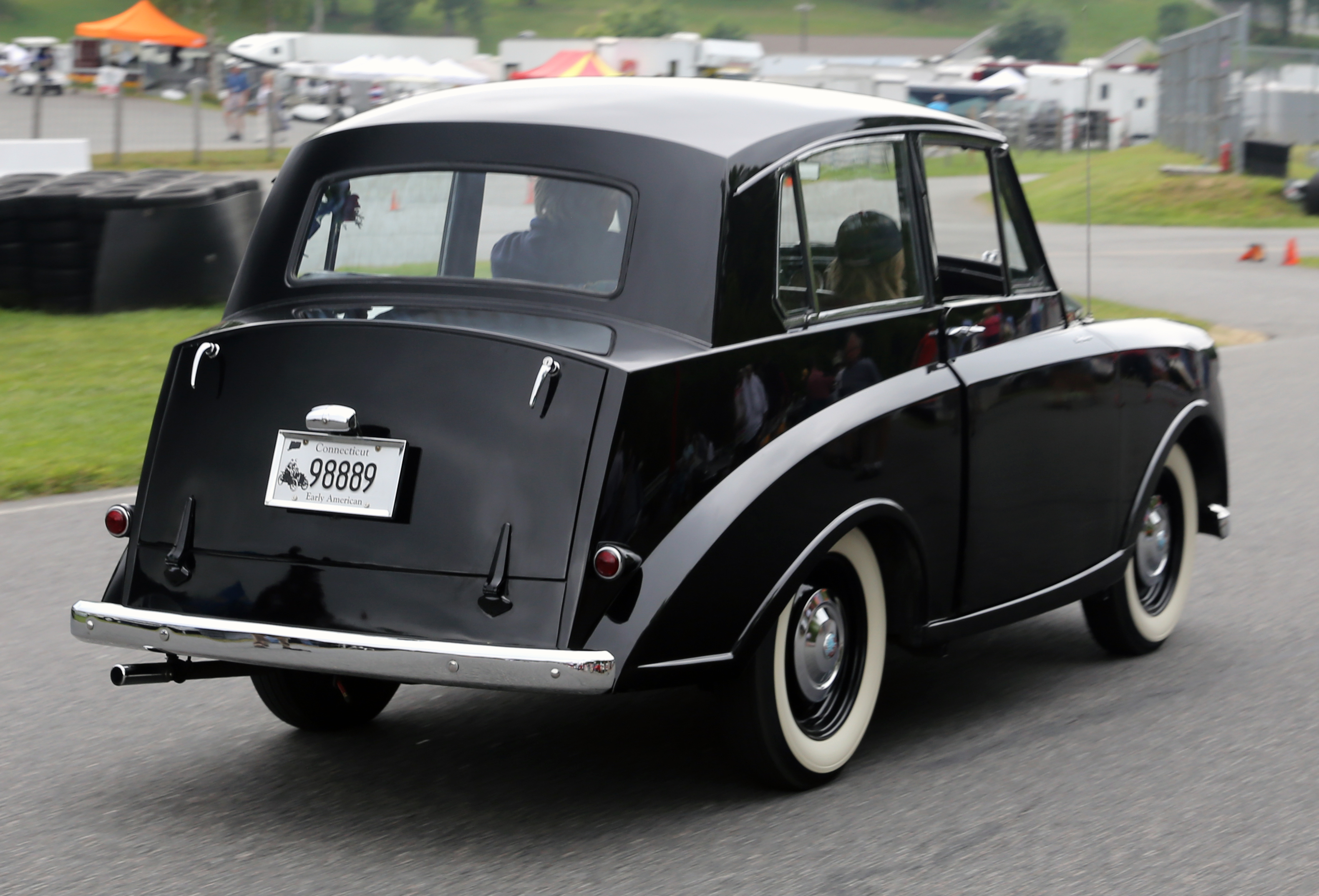
Triumph Mayflower

The Mayflower had been an attempt to create a small car with an upmarket image, but it failed to meet its sales targets. Standard announced the Mayflower's replacement in a press release in early February 1952; the announcement further stated that the replacement would probably not be on sale until 1953. The Standard Eight, which replaced the Mayflower, had a basic specification and was aimed at a different type of buyer. From the ending of Mayflower production in 1953, there was no small saloon with the Triumph name available in the United Kingdom until the launch of the Triumph Herald in 1959. The Standard Ten saloon and Standard Companion estate were sold as Triumphs in the United States.

The front suspension design from the Mayflower was used on the Triumph 20TS prototype and, with modifications, on the Triumph TR2.

=== Cultural impact ===
The Mayflower is the subject of a well-known painting by Australian artist John Brack—The Car.

=== Die-cast models ===
Die-cast models of the Mayflower include Mikansue models from the 1980s, Lansdowne models from 2006, and Oxford Diecast 00 scale models from 2008.
