= Standard wet liner inline-four engine =

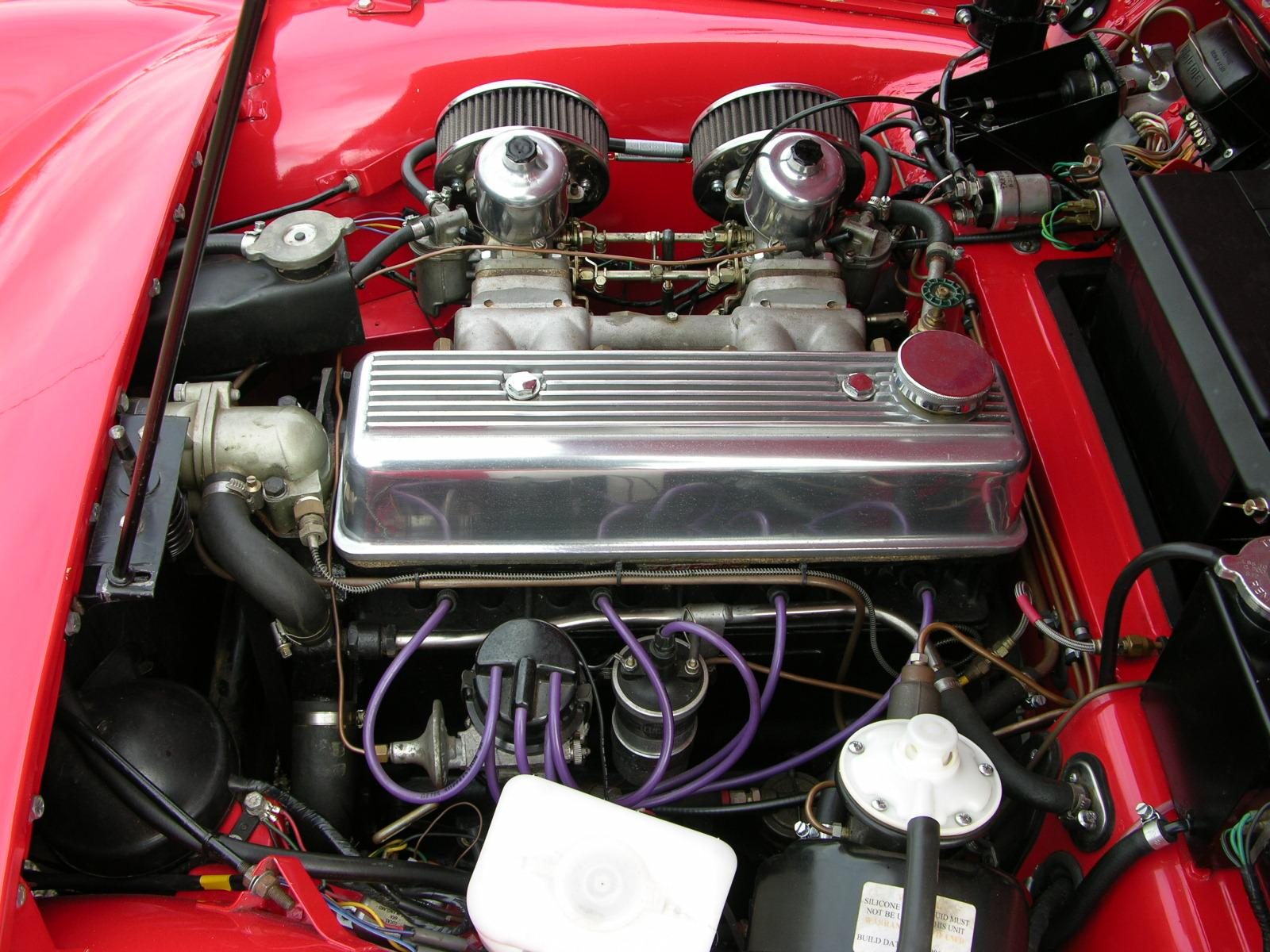
- 1991 cc Triumph version fitted in a 1961 TR3A

Overview
- Manufacturer: Standard Motor Company
- Also called: Standard Vanguard engine
- Production: 1947–1988

Layout
- Configuration: Overhead valve straight 4
- Displacement: 1,670 cc (101.9 cu in); 1,850 cc (112.9 cu in); 1,991 cc (121.5 cu in); 2,088 cc (127.4 cu in); 2,092 cc (127.7 cu in); 2,138 cc (130.5 cu in); 2,188 cc (133.5 cu in); 2,260 cc (137.9 cu in)
- Cylinder bore: 76 mm (2.99 in); 80 mm (3.15 in); 80.96 mm (3.19 in); 83 mm (3.27 in); 84.14 mm (3.31 in); 85 mm (3.35 in); 86 mm (3.39 in); 87 mm (3.43 in)
- Piston stroke: 92 mm (3.62 in); 101.6 mm (4.00 in)
- Cylinder block material: cast iron, wet liners
- Cylinder head material: cast iron
- Valvetrain: OHV

Combustion
- Fuel system: carburettor
- Fuel type: petrol (gasoline), TVO, lamp oil (variant engines, not multifuel)
- Cooling system: water-cooled

Output
- Power output: 23.9 bhp (Ferguson TE-A20 tractor); 68 bhp (Standard Vanguard)

Chronology
- Successor: Standard Triumph inline-six

The Standard wet liner inline-four engine was an inline four cylinder petrol engine produced by the Standard Motor Company. Originally developed concurrently for passenger car use and for the Ferguson TE20 tractor, it was widely used for Standard passenger cars of the 1950s, most notably the Vanguard. Later it was successfully used in Standard's popular early generation Triumph TR series sports cars.

The water-cooled overhead valve engine featured novel advances for an immediate post-war design, which included thin-wall bearings with replaceable shells and loose-fitted wet liners. Displacement varied from 1,850 cc to 2,088 cc (and 2,188 cc in a tractor variant), growing with time.

== Origins ==
The engine's origins lay in the wartime production of Bristol aero engines at the new Banner Lane shadow factory, operated by Standard in Coventry. From 1939 this factory produced Bristol Hercules engines, an air-cooled radial engine, with Bristol's typical sleeve valves. With peace in 1945, this huge factory then stood empty.

During the war, Ford had built tractors for Ferguson in Detroit. Afterwards, Ferguson wished to continue this arrangement with an improved TO20 tractor (for "Tractor Overseas") and also a TE20 (for "Tractor England") to be built by Ford's plant at Dagenham. Ford however was unwilling and it was Standard which was to build the tractors at Banner Lane. The first TE20 model used a Continental Z-120 petrol engine, but the TE-A20 and later models used a new engine developed by Standard.

== Ferguson TE20 tractor ==
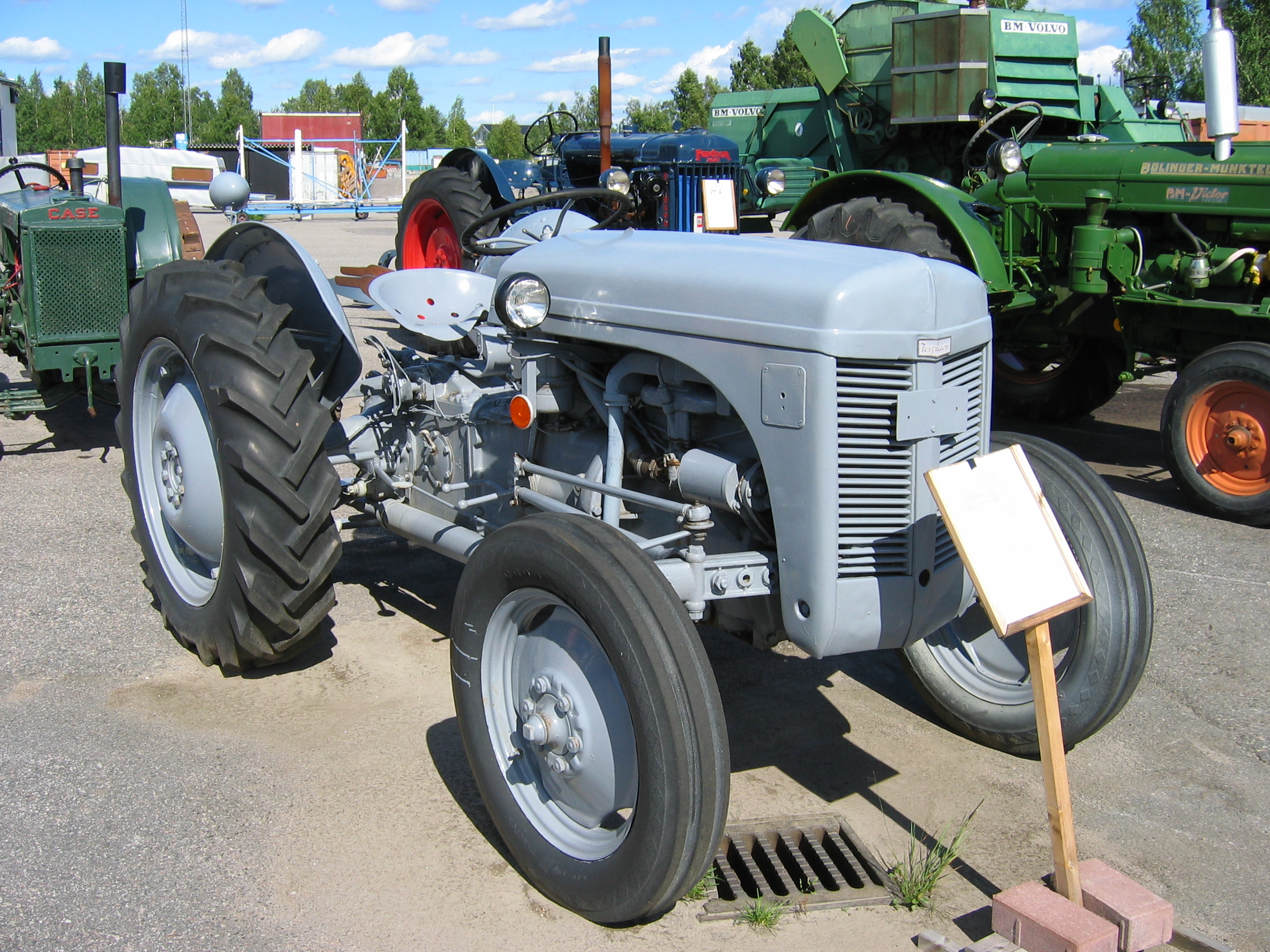
Ferguson TE20 tractor

The new tractor engine appeared in 1947. It was a petrol powered four-cylinder engine with a bore of 80 mm and stroke of 92 mm, for a total capacity of 1,850 cc. The engine was undersquare (long stroke), favouring the tractor's need for torque over horsepower and the British practice of building long stroke engines, dictated by the tax horsepower regulations. A compression ratio of 5.77:1 reflected the era's low octane fuel. Conventional overhead valves were driven from a camshaft mounted in the side of the cylinder block via vertical pushrods and adjustable rockers. Cylinder block and crankcase were one piece cast iron, as was the cylinder head. The crankshaft had three main bearings typical of 4 cylinder engines of the era.

Construction of the engine would be regarded as typical for the 1950s, although this engine was developed in the late 1940s and its lineal derivatives, the Triumph straight-four and straight-six engines, would remain in production into the 1970s. In some aspects it was advanced for its day, particularly in its use of components such as pistons being pre-graded into standardised sizes and marked as such. This avoided the need for costly hand-fitting during assembly and also simplified replacement in service. It was one of the first mass-production engines to use thin-wall bearings: a steel shell faced with whitemetal bearing material. Rather than re-metalling the bearing journals and hand-scraping a new bearing surface to fit the crankshaft, these bearings were disposable after use. Several replacement bearing shells were expected to be fitted before the crankshaft required re-grinding. Had the tractor been built at Ford, Dagenham as originally intended, it is likely that the engine would still have been designed around the whitemetal bearings that Ford continued with on small car engines throughout the 1950s.

The distinctive, and unusual, feature of the engine was its use of wet liners to form the cylinders. Rather than the cylinders being bored into the cast-iron block, separate thin-walled steel tubes were inserted into a hollow block. The space between liner and block formed a large uninterrupted water jacket, which improved cylinder heat dispersal into the cooling system, as did the thin tubes of the liners. The liners were only loosely installed into the block with hand pressure. The sealing of the liners into the engine block was at the bottom by a pair of soft metal "spectacle washers" that each sealed a pair of liners. Each liner stood slightly proud of the cylinder block face. so that it formed a good seal against the head gasket when assembled. Such wet liners had been used in high performance engines for many years, but this was an early example of them for a low-cost, mass-production engine. Particularly with the advanced grinding techniques necessary to make such a thin-walled tube with good concentricity and surface finish, other manufacturers saw them as over-complex. However Banner Lane's building of sleeve-valve Bristol engines during the war had given them the necessary experience and equipment. Throughout the engine's service it was seen as a dependable and reliable engine, if slightly staid and tractor-like. The liners never gave the trouble experienced by other engines such as the much later Rover K-series.

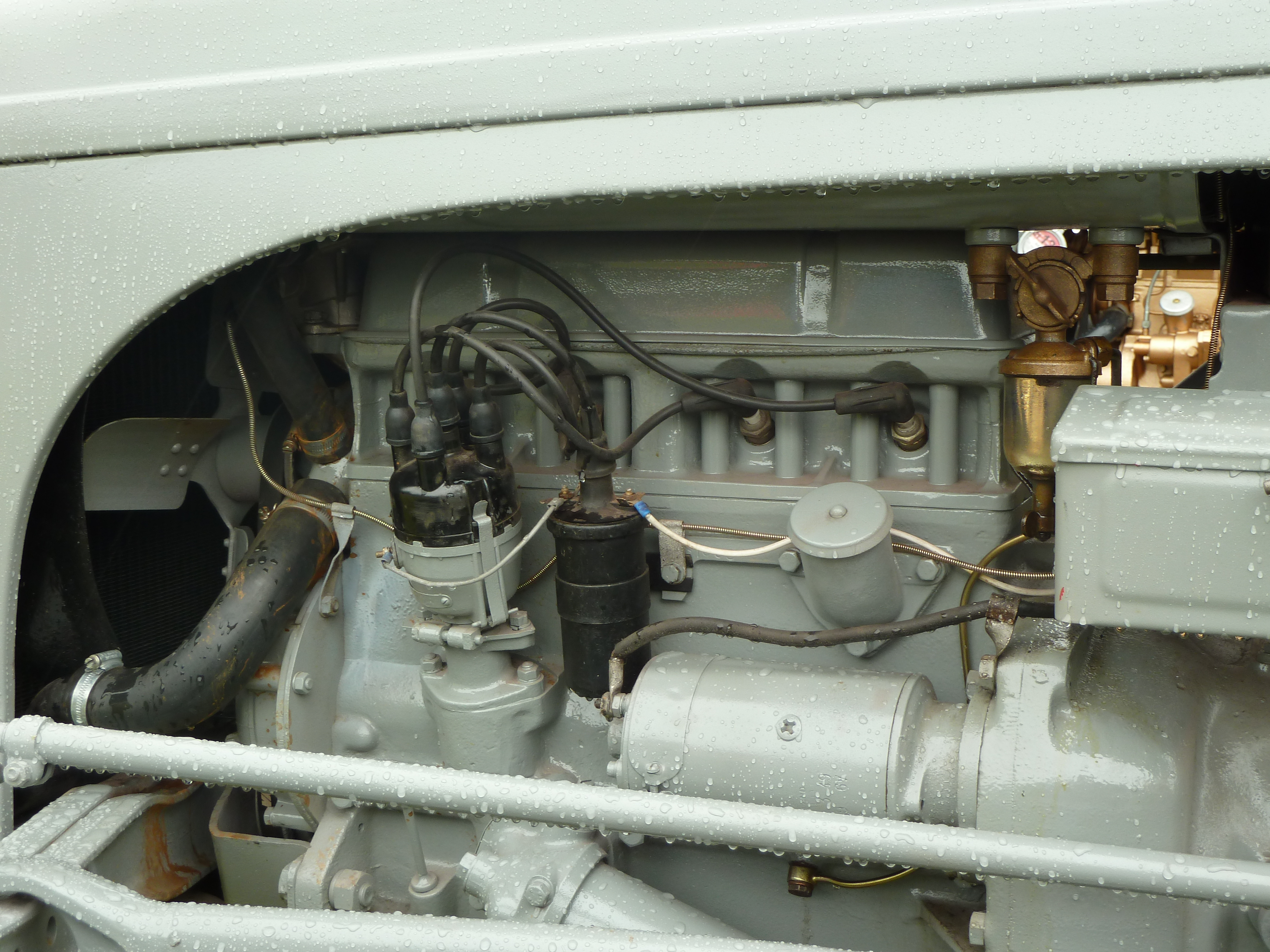
Spark plug side of cylinder head, showing the valve pushrod tubes (Ferguson TE20 tractor)

Another distinctive, although less revolutionary, feature of the engine was the location of the tubes carrying the valve pushrods. Rather than being cast inside the cylinder head, thus requiring more cores and complexity, they were outside the main casting of the cylinder head. The top and bottom faces of the cylinder head were extended to form a flange on the camshaft side of the engine with individual steel tubes placed through the flanges to enclose each pushrod (a similar system was used for the Volkswagen Beetle engine, albeit with longer tubes the entire length of the cylinder). These tubes were expanded at top and bottom to seal them and thus became a permanent part of the cylinder head. The separate tubes were reliable, less expensive to manufacture than casting them into the head, and gave that side of the engine its distinctive "hollow" appearance with the rocker box appearing to be supported by columns.

Farms up until then had little machinery, electricity was still uncommon, and the tractor was also expected to be able to power farm machinery. For this purpose, the tractor was equipped with a power take-off shaft at the rear. This could drive either a hitched implement such as a rotovator, or static machinery such as a thresher. The engine was fitted with a governor to allow the engine speed to be set somewhere between idling speed of 400 rpm and full power speed of 2,200 rpm, maintaining this speed against varying loads. The "belt hp" rating of the tractor was 23.9 hp although the tax rating of 20 hp gave the tractor its model number of TE20.

=== Alternative fuels ===
The first tractor models of 1947 were built for petrol fuel. In 1949 versions of the engine using TVO, and in 1950 lamp oil were introduced. TVO has a low octane rating of around 60 and so the engine had the usual changes to compression ratio and ignition timing. A heat shield around the manifolds increased the inlet temperature, encouraging vapourisation of the fuel. To avoid problems with fuel condensation in the inlet ports, diameter of the valves (in some engine versions) was also reduced, thus increasing flow velocity. The lamp oil engine used a zero octane paraffin (kerosene) fuel, but was only suitable for use in warm climates, or else the fuel did not vapourise adequately.

In March 1951 Standard produced their first diesel engine for the TE-F20 tractor. Called the Standard 20C, this was a new engine design, different from the petrol engine. Bore of 3 3/16 in (80.96 mm) and stroke of 4 in (101.6 mm) gave a capacity of 2,092 cc. In 1954 this engine also found its way into the Phase II Vanguard, making this Britain's first production diesel car. This was followed by the Standard 23C engine in 1956. The 23C had its bore increased to 3 5/16 in (84.14 mm) for a capacity of 2,260 cc. Massey-Ferguson stopped using the Standard engine in favor of Perkins units in 1959. After Standard-Triumph was taken over by Leyland in 1961, this engine was updated and redesignated Leyland OE.138.

=== 85 and 87 mm engines ===
A larger capacity of 2,088 cc was achieved by changing the pistons and liners for a bore of 85 mm, retaining the stroke of 92 mm. These are generally known as "85 mm engines", in contrast to the original "80 mm". After 1955, the engines in Ferguson tractors had a bore of 87 mm, giving a capacity of 2,188 cc engines.

== Standard cars ==
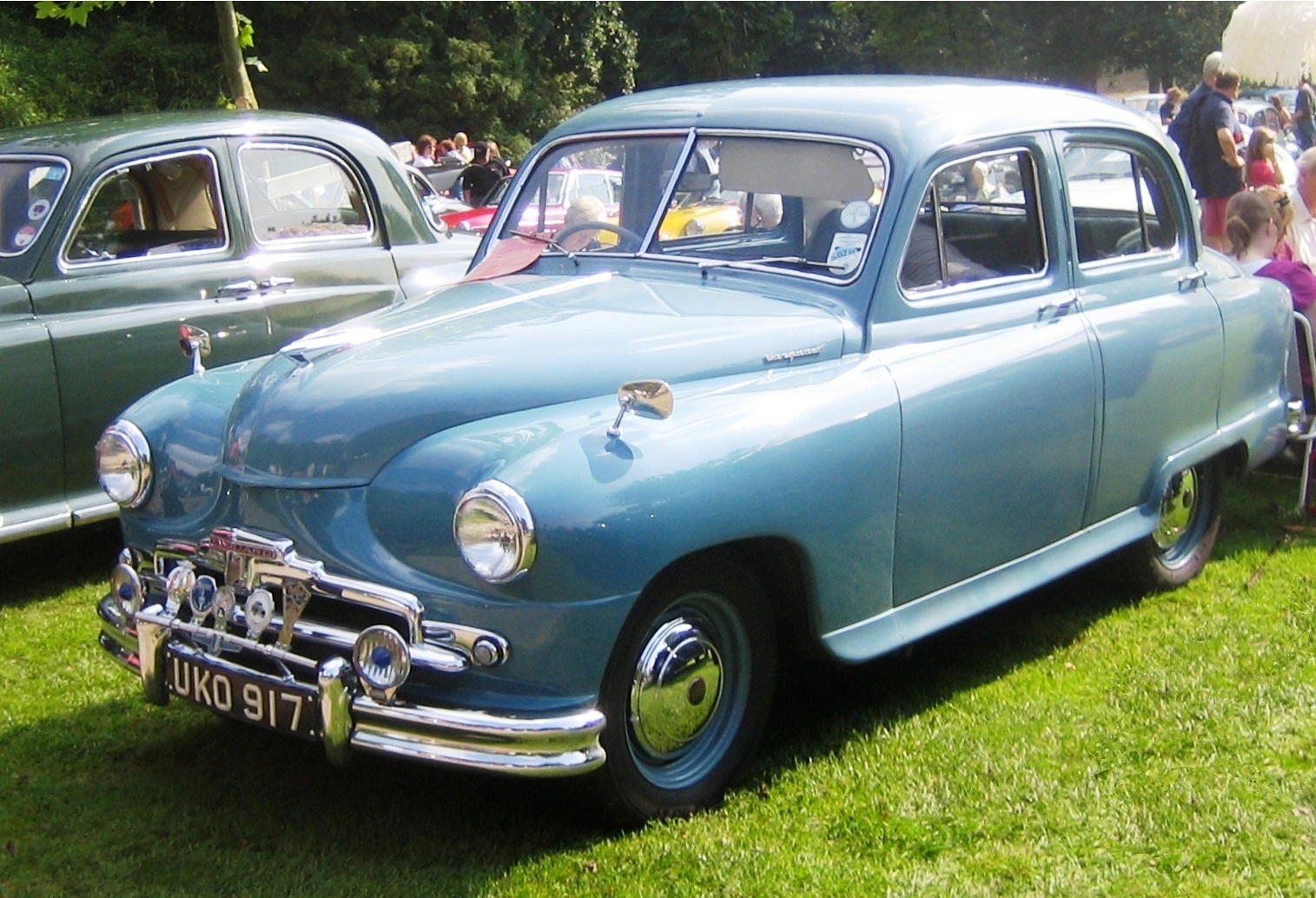
Standard Vanguard

The Standard Vanguard used the same 2,088 cc "85 mm" engine that had been developed for the tractor. Compression ratio remained the same at 6:1 but the valve and ignition timing were changed to suit road driving conditions and a more predictable quality of petrol. The governor was removed and the power output rose to 68 bhp. The Phase III version of the Vanguard, introduced in 1955, had a compression ratio of 7.5:1 but the power output remained at 68 hp (51 kW).

The engine was also used in two variants of the Vanguard. The Sportsman was a high-performance version made in 1956 and 1957 with two SU carburettors and a compression ratio of 8:1, yielding 90 hp (67 kW) at 4500 rpm. The Ensign was an economy version introduced in 1957. The engine in the original Ensign had its cylinders sleeved to 76 mm, giving a capacity of 1670 cc and a power output of 60 hp (45 kW) at 4000 rpm. In 1962 this was replaced by an uprated Ensign with an 86 mm bore, giving a capacity of 2138 cc and a power output of 75 hp (56 kW) at 4100 rpm.

The last car to use this engine was the Standard 2000 in India. When it was introduced in 1986, the engine was modified with Heron combustion chamber, twin SU carburetors and a redesigned inlet manifold. The bore was around 84.45mm and original stroke of 92mm made it into a 2061cc engine. It made a claimed 83 bhp at 4250 rpm and production ended when Standard India shut down in 1988.

== Triumph cars ==
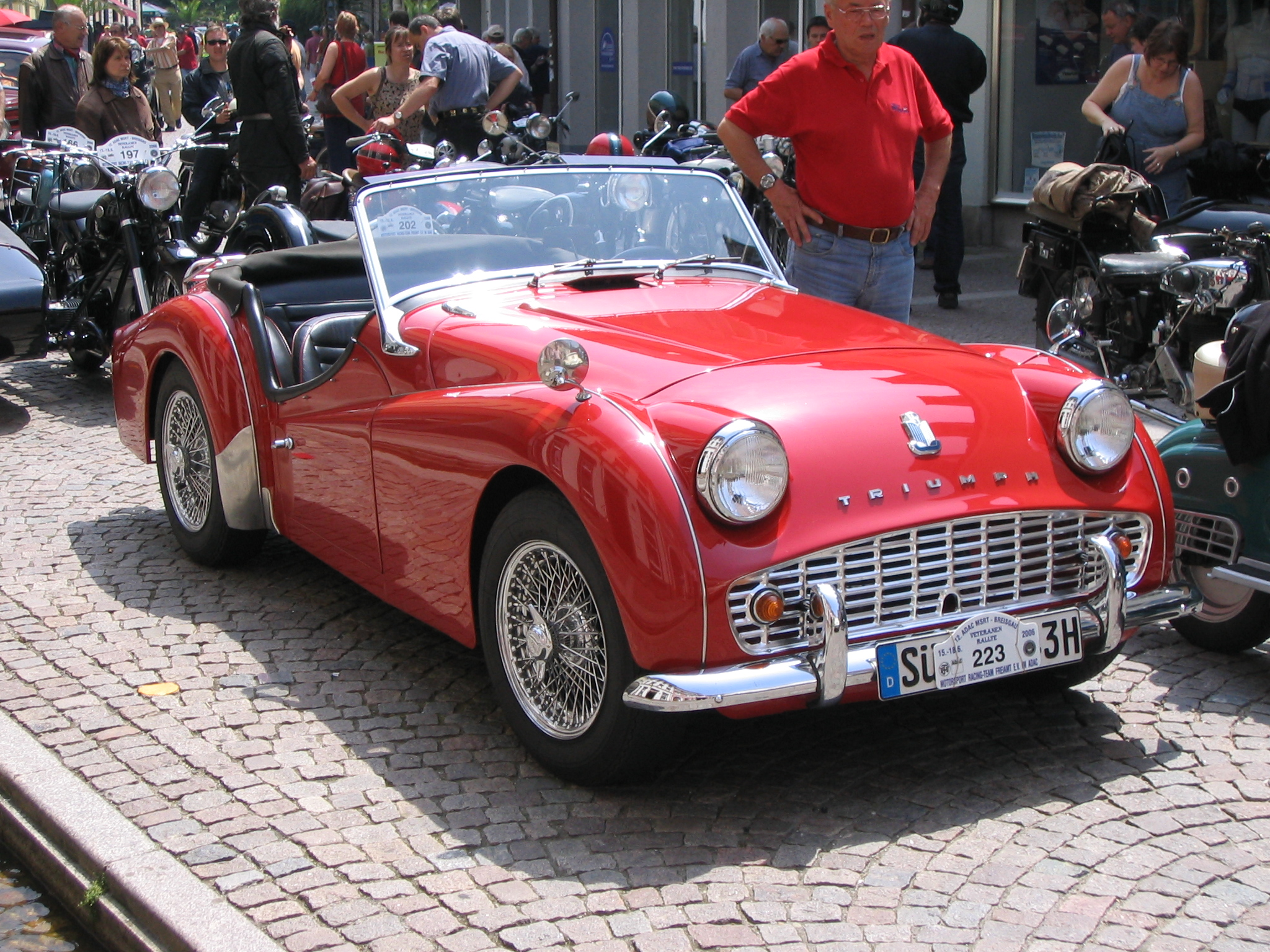
Triumph TR3A

Standard bought the assets of the Triumph Motor Company in 1944 and, after the Second World War, began manufacture of the Triumph Town and Country saloon and the Triumph Roadster based on pre-war Standard components. The drivetrain of the Roadster was replaced by the Vanguard drivetrain, including the 85 mm wet liner engine, in October 1948; the saloon's drivetrain was similarly transplanted in February 1949.

The wet liner engine was used in all Triumph TR-series sports cars from the TR-X and 20TS prototypes to the TR4A. All the TRs using this engine used two SU carburettors except the TR4A, which used two Strombergs.

Engine data for TR models using the Standard wet liner engine
model	bore (mm)	capacity (cc)	comp. ratio	power output	engine speed at max. power output, rpm
TR-X (prototype)	85	2088	7.0:1	71 hp (53 kW)	4200
20TS (prototype)	83	1991	7.0:1	75 hp (56 kW)	4500
TR2	83	1991	8.5:1	90 hp (67 kW)	4500
TR3 and TR3A	83	1991	8.5:1	100 hp (75 kW)	5000
TR3B and TR4	86	2138	9.0:1	100 hp (75 kW)	4600
TR4A	86	2138	9.0:1	104 hp (78 kW)	4700

== Other applications ==
The wet liner engine was sold to specialist manufacturers without the resources to build their own engines. Most notable among these was Morgan, which used the engine in their Plus 4. Others included sports car maker Peerless, which was later reorganized as Warwick, and Swallow Coachbuilding, who used the engine in their Doretti.
