= Rumble seat =

Historical automobile seating in rear

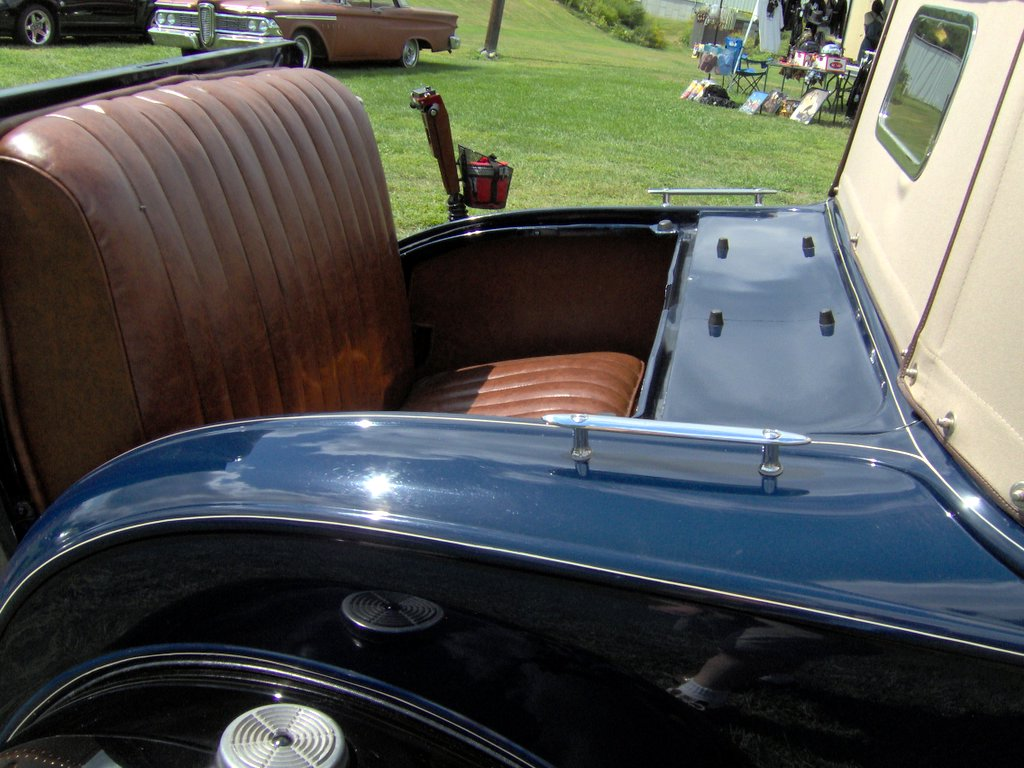
1931 Ford Model A sport roadster featuring a rumble seat

A rumble seat (American English), dicky (dickie/dickey) seat (British English), also called a mother-in-law seat, is an upholstered exterior front-facing seat which is folded into the rear of a coach, carriage, or early motorcar. Depending on its configuration, it provided exposed seating for one or two passengers.

== History ==
Additional occasional seating appeared in the latter centuries of evolution of the coach and carriage. The 1865 edition of Webster's An American Dictionary of the English Language defines a dickie seat or rumble as "A boot (Note: Boot, n. ...3. A box or receptacle covered with leather at either end of a coach. (Webster, Goodrich & Porter 1865, p. 152) The term "boot" is still used in Commonwealth English, but in North America, this is called the "trunk".) with a seat above it for servants, behind a carriage." Similar to the dickie seat on European phaetons was the spider, a small single seat or bench on spindly supports for seating a groom or footman.

Before World War I, dickie or rumble seats did not always fold into the bodywork. Following it, such optional passenger arrangements typically were integrated into the rear deck. When unoccupied, the remaining space, if any, under the seat's lid could be used for storing luggage.

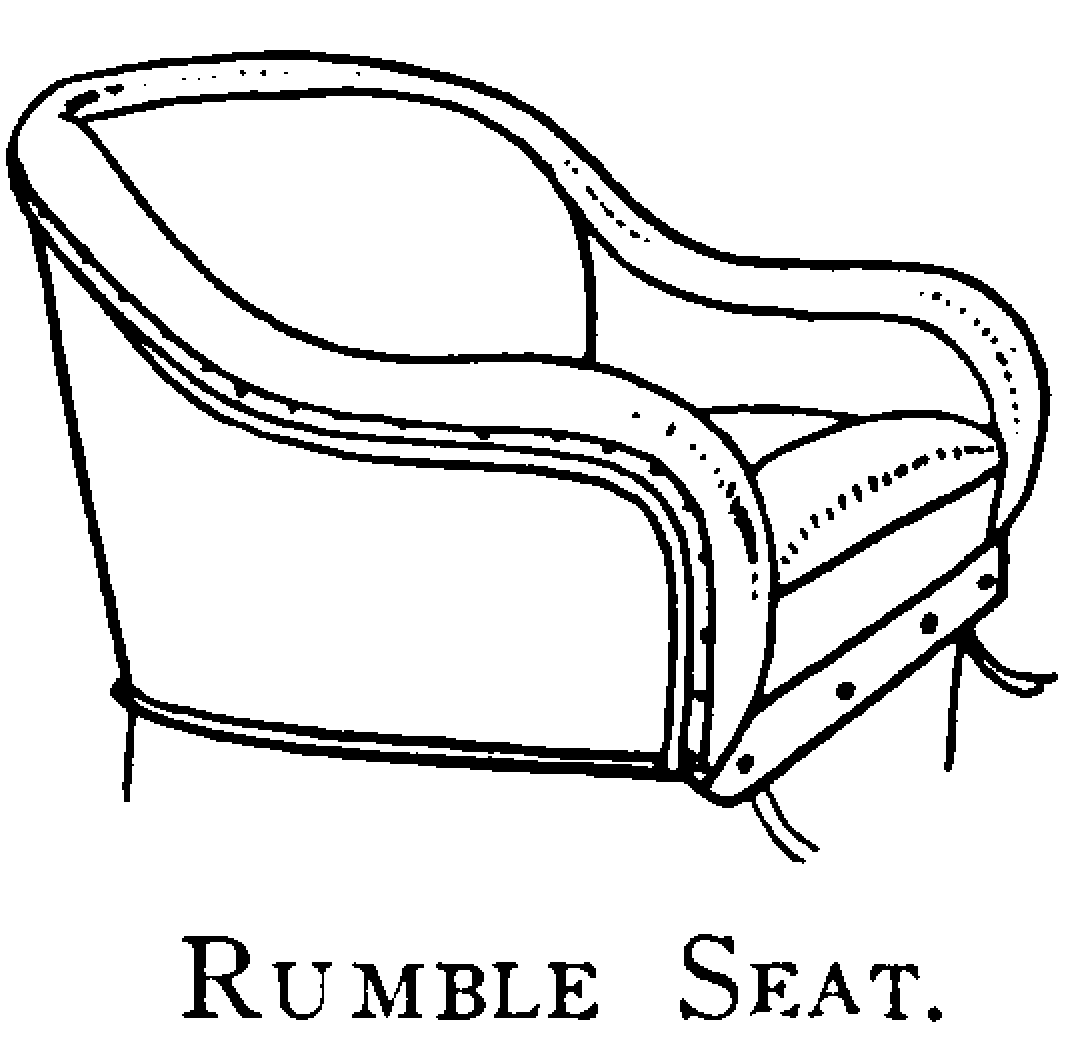
Illustration of rumble seat, c. 1913

Roadster, coupe and cabriolet car body styles were offered with either a luggage compartment or a rumble seat in the deck. Models equipped with a rumble seat were often referred to as a sport coupe or sport roadster.

Rumble seat passengers were exposed to the elements, and received little or no protection from the regular passenger compartment top. Folding tops and side curtains for rumble seats were available for some cars (including the two-door version of the Ford Model A) but never achieved much popularity. Among the last American-built cars with a rumble seat were the 1938 Chevrolet, 1939 Ford, 1939 Dodge, and 1939 Plymouth. The last British built car with a dickey seat was the Triumph 2000 Roadster made until 1949.

== See also ==
- Car seat
- Folding seat
- List of chairs
- Subaru BRAT, which used a similar seating configuration when sold in North America to avoid the chicken tax.

== Sources ==
- Benjaminson, Jim (16 November 2020). "Early Plymouth convertibles, 1928-1971". allpar.com.
- Chrysler Corporation, Staff of (2020). "Dodge cars, 1914-1966". allpar.com.
- Clough, Albert L. (1913). A dictionary of automobile terms. The Horseless Age Company.
- Georgano, G. N., ed. (1971). "Glossary". Encyclopedia of American Automobiles. New York, NY USA: E. P. Dutton. pp. 215–217. ISBN 0-525-097929. LCCN 79-147885.
- Haajanen, Lennart W. (2003). Illustrated Dictionary of Automobile Body Styles. Illustrations by Bertil Nydén. Jefferson, NC USA: McFarland. ISBN 0-7864-1276-3. LCCN 2002014546.
- Hingston, Peter (2007). The Enthusiasts' Guide to Buying a Classic British Sports Car. Eaton Bishop, Hereford, UK: Hingston Publishing. p. 164. ISBN 978-0-906555-25-5.
- Lawrence, Mike (1997) [1991]. A to Z of Sports Cars, 1945-1990. Bideford, Devon UK: Bay View Books. ISBN 1-870979-81-8.
- Webster, Noah; Goodrich, Chauncey A.; Porter, Noah, eds. (1865). "Rumble seat". An American Dictionary of the English Language. Springfield, MA USA: G. & C. Merriam.
