= Triumph Roadster =

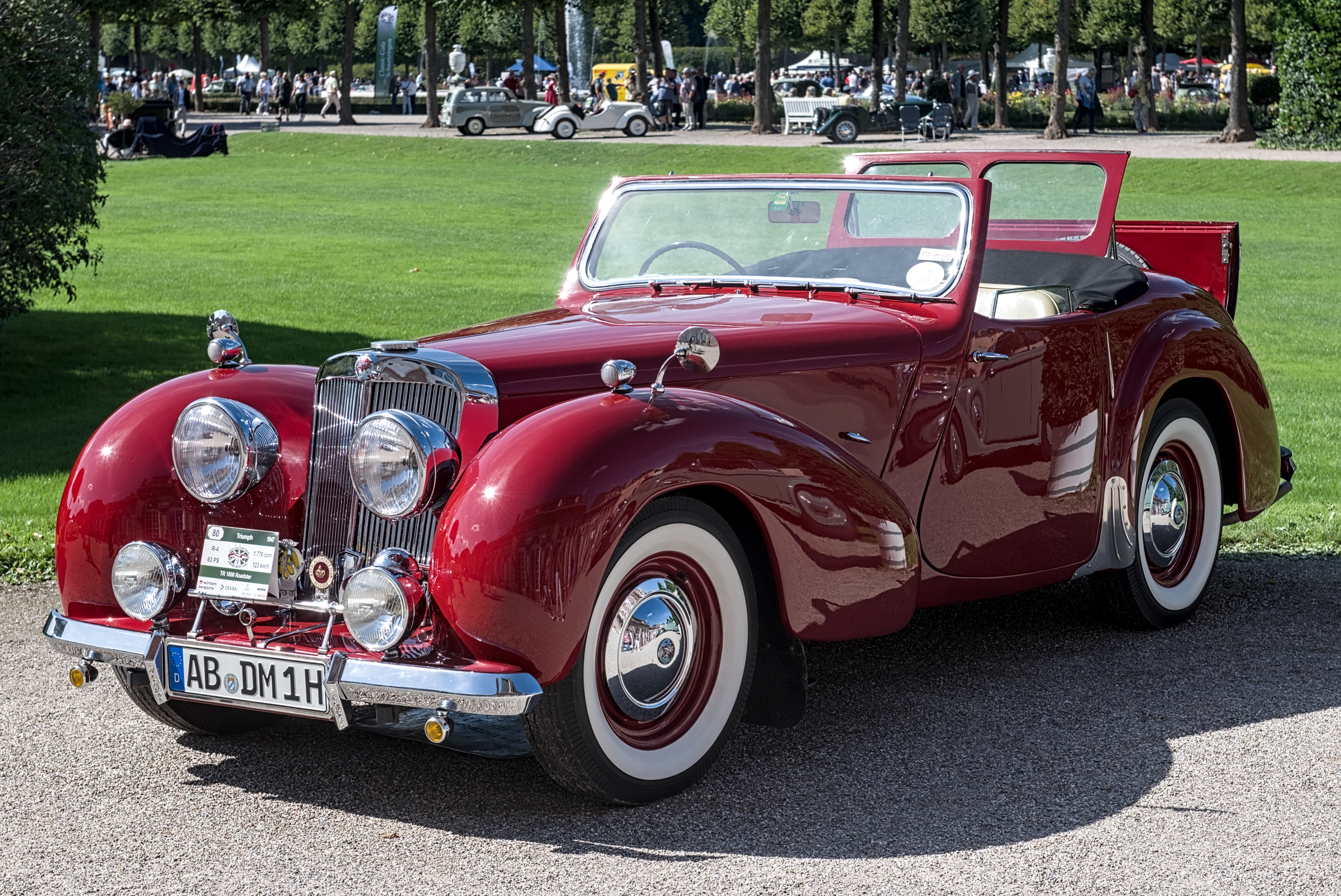
- Triumph 1800 Roadster

Overview
- Manufacturer: Standard Motor Company
- Production: 1800: 1946–1948, 2501 made; 2000: 1948–1949, 2000 made
- Assembly: United Kingdom: Coventry

Body and chassis
- Class: Sports car

Powertrain
- Engine: 1800: 1776 cc; 2000: 2088 cc; OHV I4
- Transmission: 1800: 4-speed manual; 2000: 3-speed manual

Dimensions
- Wheelbase: 100 in (2,540 mm)
- Length: 168.4 in (4,277 mm)
- Width: 64 in (1,626 mm)
- Kerb weight: 1800: 2,540 lb (1,152 kg); 2000: 2,460 lb (1,116 kg)

Chronology
- Successor: Triumph TR2

The Triumph Roadster is a roadster produced by Britain's Standard Motor Company from 1946 until 1949. It was sold as the Triumph 1800 Roadster (18TR) from 1946 to 1948, and as the Triumph 2000 Roadster (TRA) from 1948 to 1949.

== Triumph 1800 Roadster (18TR) ==
The 1800 Roadster, model number 18TR, was designed in the closing days of World War II. Triumph had been bought by the Standard Motor Company in 1944, and the managing director of Standard, Sir John Black, wanted a sports car to take on Jaguar, which had used Standard engines in the pre-war period. Frank Callaby was selected to style the new car. After getting Black's approval for the general shape, Callaby worked with Arthur Ballard to design the details of the body. Design of the rolling chassis was by Ray Turner. Walter Belgrove, who had styled the pre-war Triumphs and was employed as Chief Body Engineer, had no part in the design.

Early post-war steel shortages meant that most of the body was built from aluminium over an ash frame, using rubber press tools that had been used making panels for the largely wooden bodied Mosquito bomber that had been built by Standard during the war. Only the front wings were made of steel. The frame was hand welded up from steel tube. The engine was a version of Standard's 1.5-litre, four-cylinder side-valve design that had been converted to overhead valves by Harry Weslake and built by Standard exclusively for SS-Jaguar before World War II. The Triumph version featured a downdraught Solex carburettor instead of the Jaguar's side-draught SU, and a 6.7:1 compression ratio instead of 7.6:1. A four-speed gearbox with synchromesh on the top three ratios was used.

The tubular steel chassis was a short-wheelbase version of the 1800 saloon, featuring transverse leaf sprung independent suspension at the front and a live axle with semi-elliptic springs at the rear. The rear track was wider than the front by 4 inches. Brakes were hydraulic.

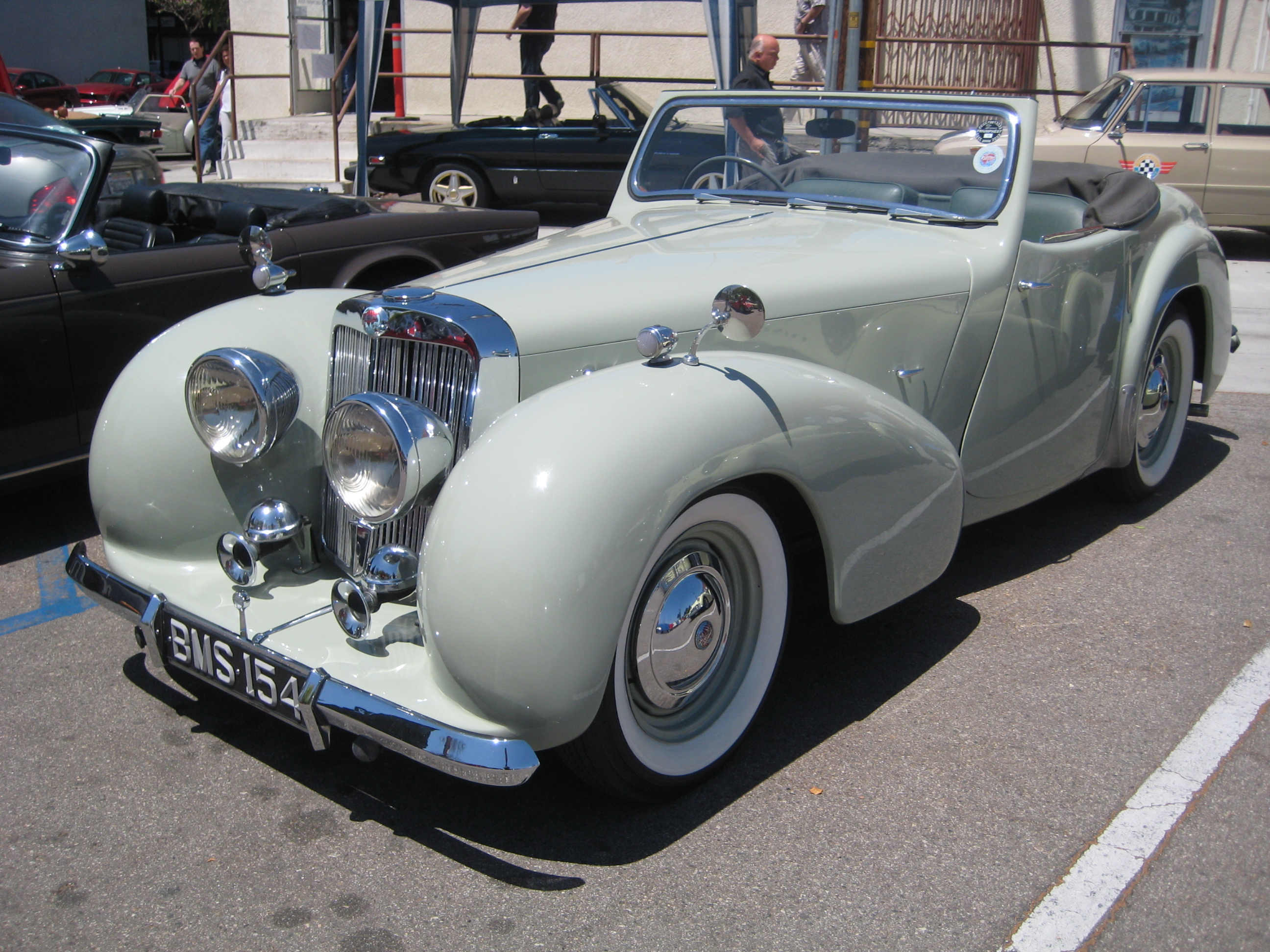
1946 Triumph 1800 Roadster

The body design was anachronistic. A journalist old enough to remember the pre-war Dolomite Roadster that had inspired the car felt that the elegant proportions of the earlier model had been abandoned in favour of a committee-based compromise, "a plump Christmas turkey to set against that dainty peacock ... [more] Toadster [than Roadster]". The front had large separate headlamps and the radiator was well back from the front between large "coal scuttle" wings. Passenger accommodation was on a bench seat that was claimed to seat three: the car's 64 inch width helped make a reality of the three-abreast seating, and the approach meant a column gear change was required. The car's unusual width also made it necessary to fit three screen wipers in a row, an example followed by early shallow windscreen Jaguar E Types. Additional room for two was provided at the rear in a dickey seat with its own folding windscreen: this was outside the hood that could be erected to cover the front seat. Entry and exit to the dickey seat was never easy and a step was provided on the rear bumper. The Roadster was the last production car with a dickey seat.

On test by Autocar magazine in 1947 top speed was found to be 75 mph (121 km/h) and 0–60 mph (0–97 km/h) took 34.4 seconds. The magazine described the maximum speed as "satisfying but not startlingly high".

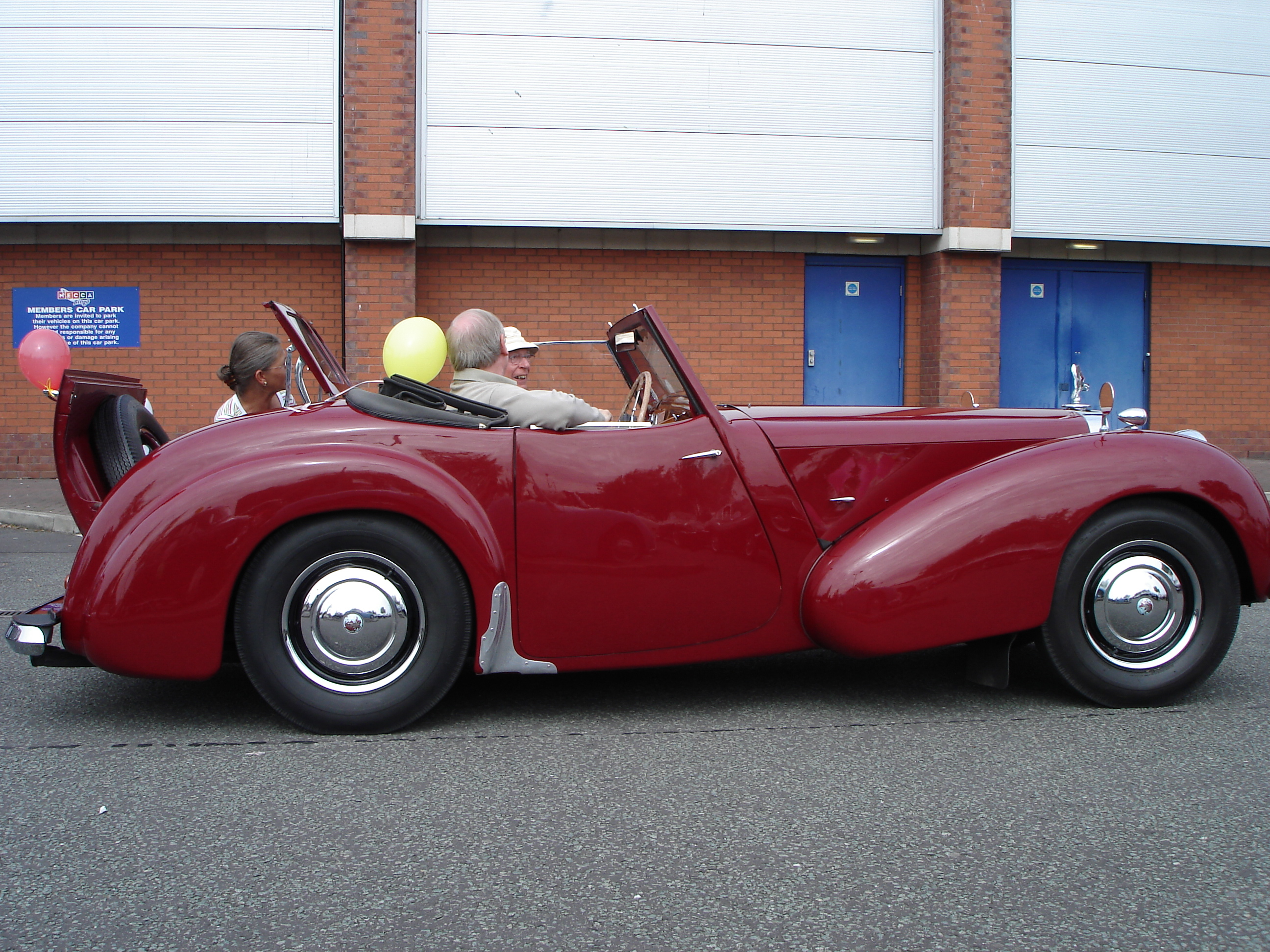
Triumph 1800 Roadster from the side

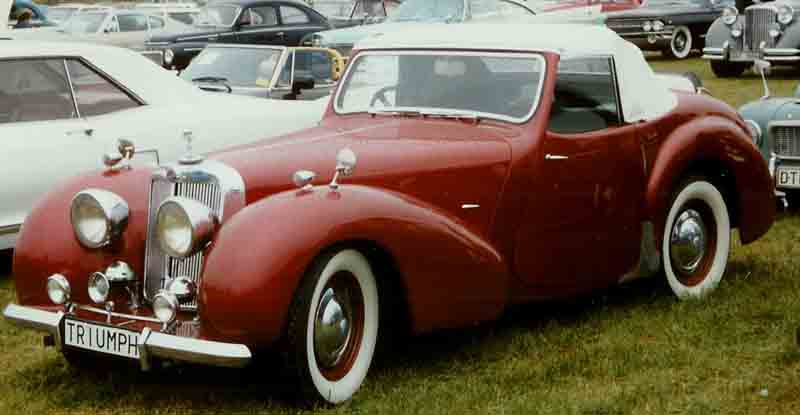
Triumph 1800 Roadster with hood

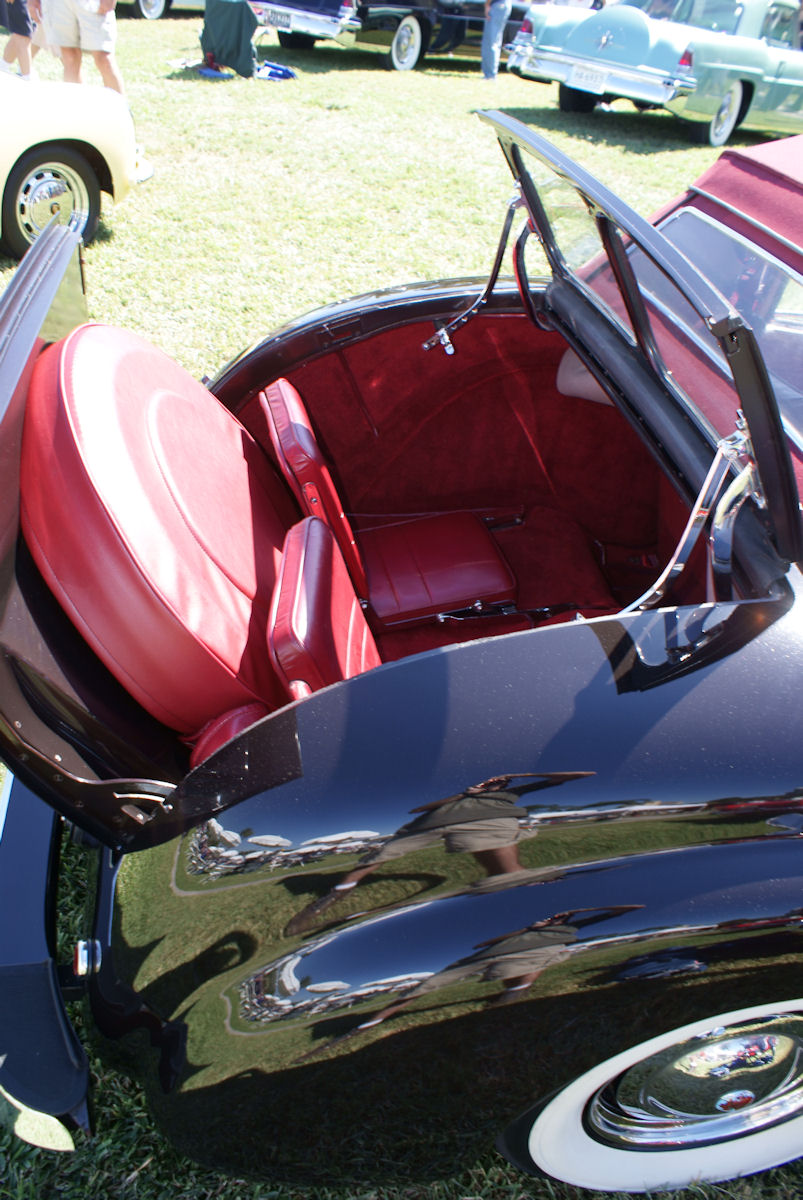
Dickey seat

== Triumph 2000 Roadster (TRA) ==
The only significant upgrade in the Roadster's production came in September 1948 for the 1949 models, when the 2088 cc Vanguard engine, transmission, and rear axle were fitted. With the larger engine the four-speed gearbox was replaced with a three-speed unit, even though it now had synchromesh on bottom gear. Apart from minor modifications to the mounting points, the chassis, suspension and steering were unaltered. This later version of the Roadster was given the model designation 20TR.

On test the changes resulted in the top speed increasing marginally to 77 mph (124 km/h) but the 0–60 mph time was much better at 27.9 seconds.

The car was never made in large numbers and was mainly hand built. 2501 examples of the 1800 and 2000 of the larger-engined version were made. Production ended in October 1949.

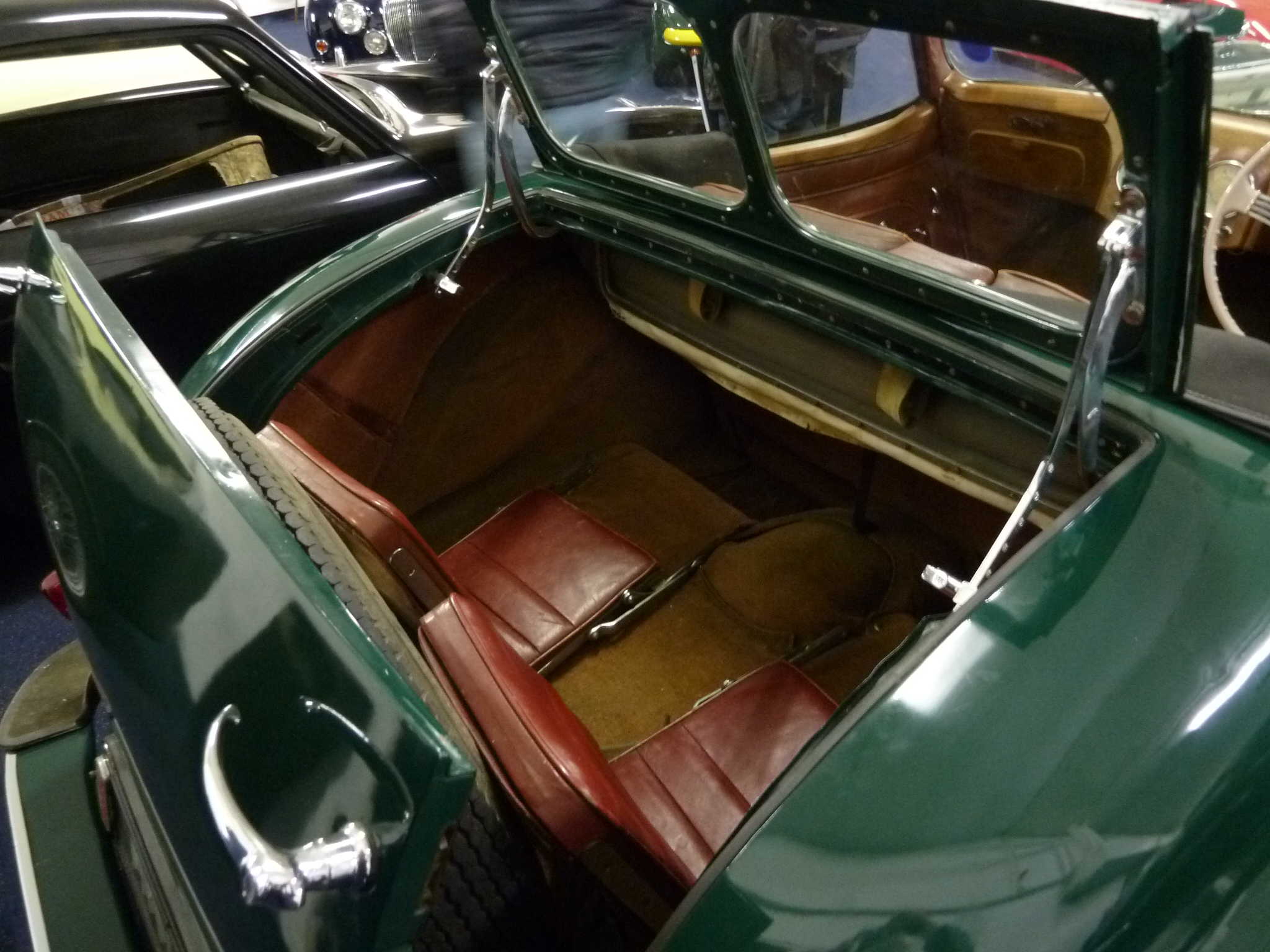
Triumph 2000 Roadster dickey seat with folding windscreen

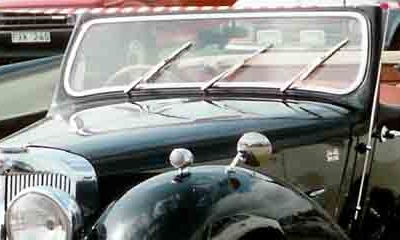
Triple windscreen wipers on a Roadster

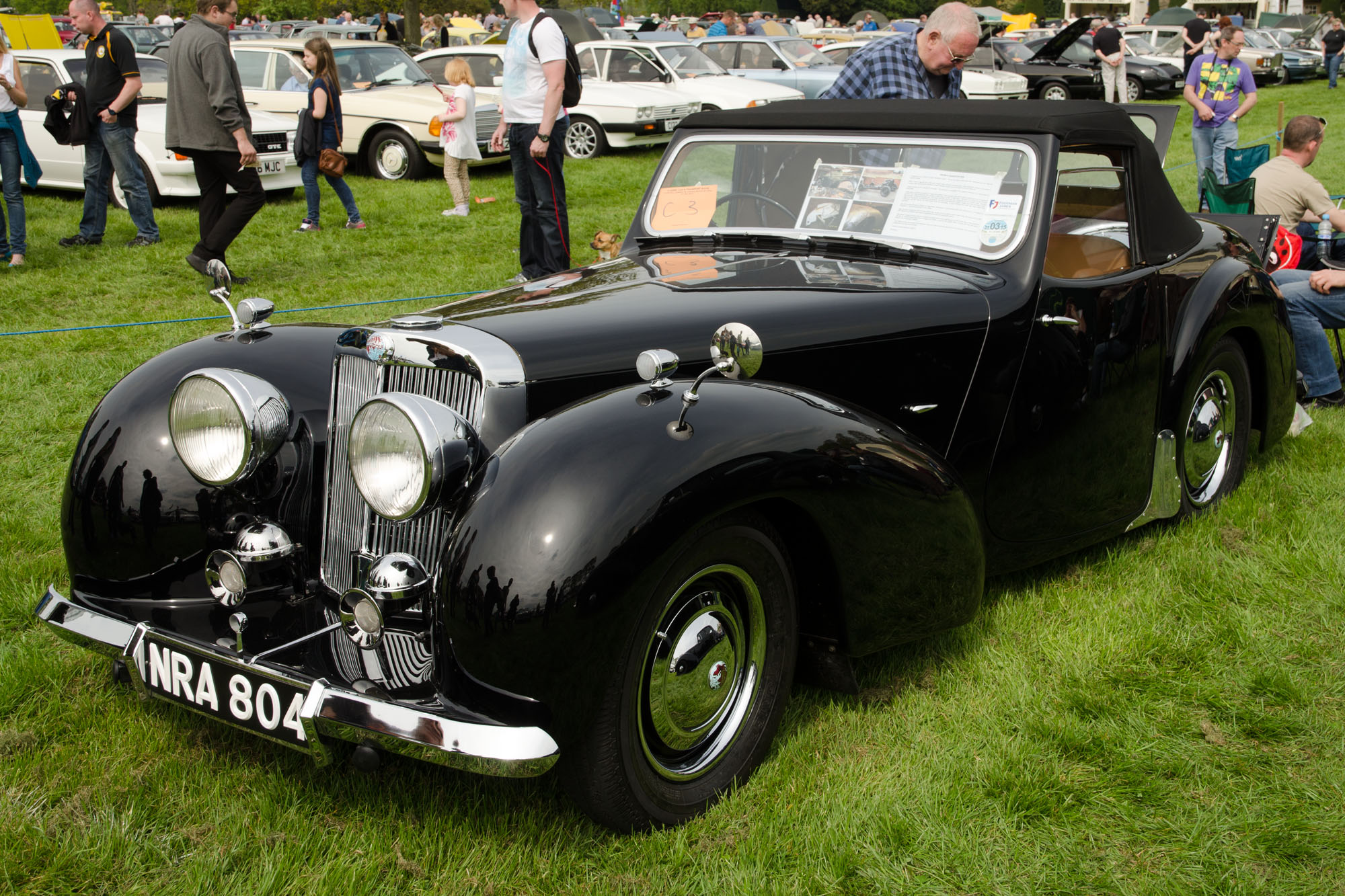
Triumph 2000 Roadster

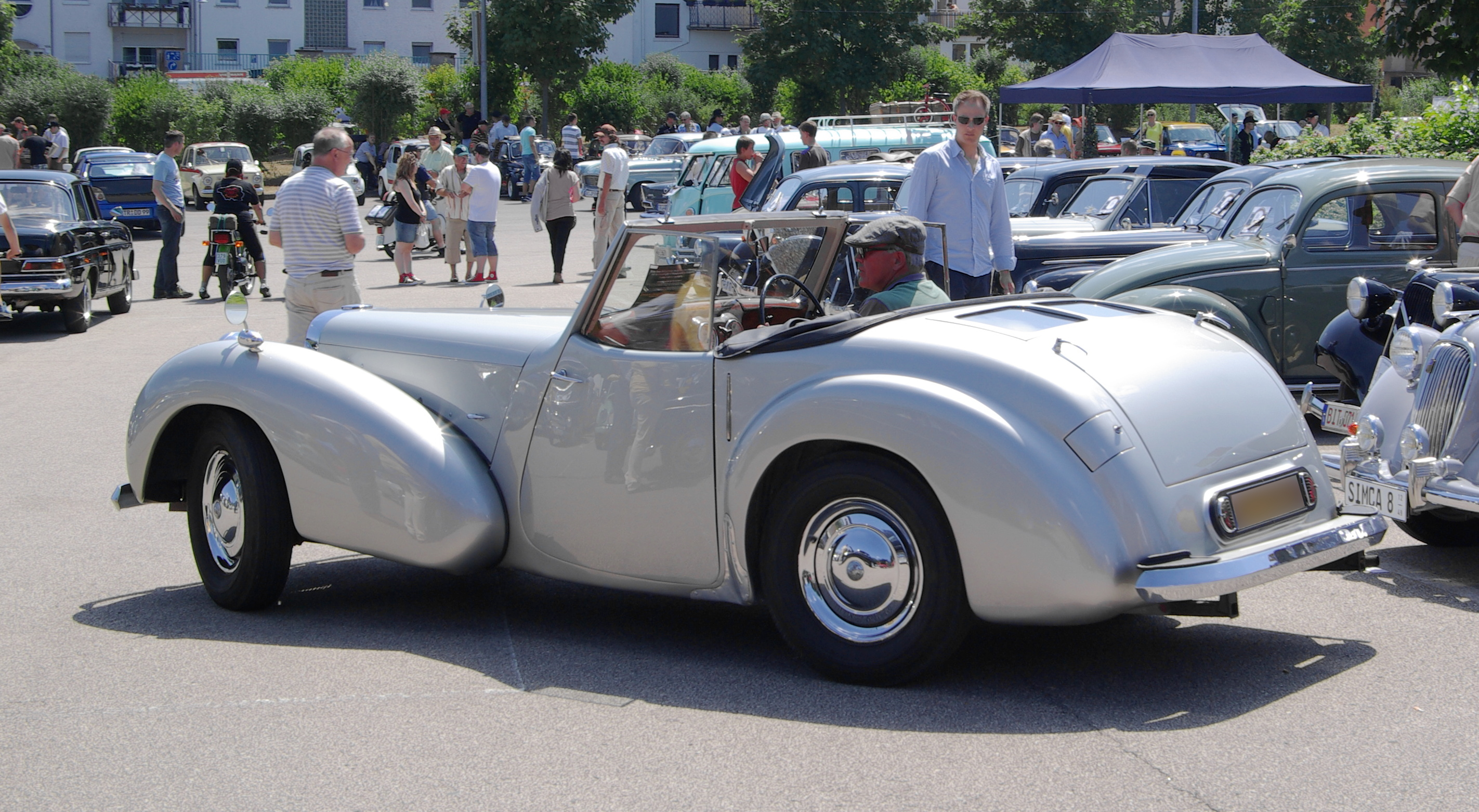
Rear side view

== Triumph Roadster (TR-X) ==
This car was announced and a prototype displayed at the October 1950 motor shows in Paris and at Earls Court on stand 145. Its full-width body was built on a Standard Vanguard chassis with an engine given twin down-draught carburettors and a higher output. The envelope type coachwork incorporated more power actuated components than any previous British car. Those components included: headlight shutters that opened automatically when the headlights were switched on; convertible hood; windows; seat; and radio aerial.

Some of the electro-hydraulic mechanisms were concealed between the twin skins of the body.

== In popular culture ==
The British actor John Nettles drove a burgundy 1947 Triumph 1800 Roadster in the 1980s BBC television crime drama series Bergerac, set on the Channel Island of Jersey. Two cars were actually used over the duration of the series production; this was made evident by the colour difference of the front mudguards and body without bonnet mascot on one car used in the earlier series, and the same colour front mudguards and body with the bonnet mascot on the other car used in later series. The same number plate J 1610 was used on both cars in the series; in some episodes, both cars appeared purporting to be the same car.
