= Swallow Doretti =

British sports car produced from 1954 to 1955

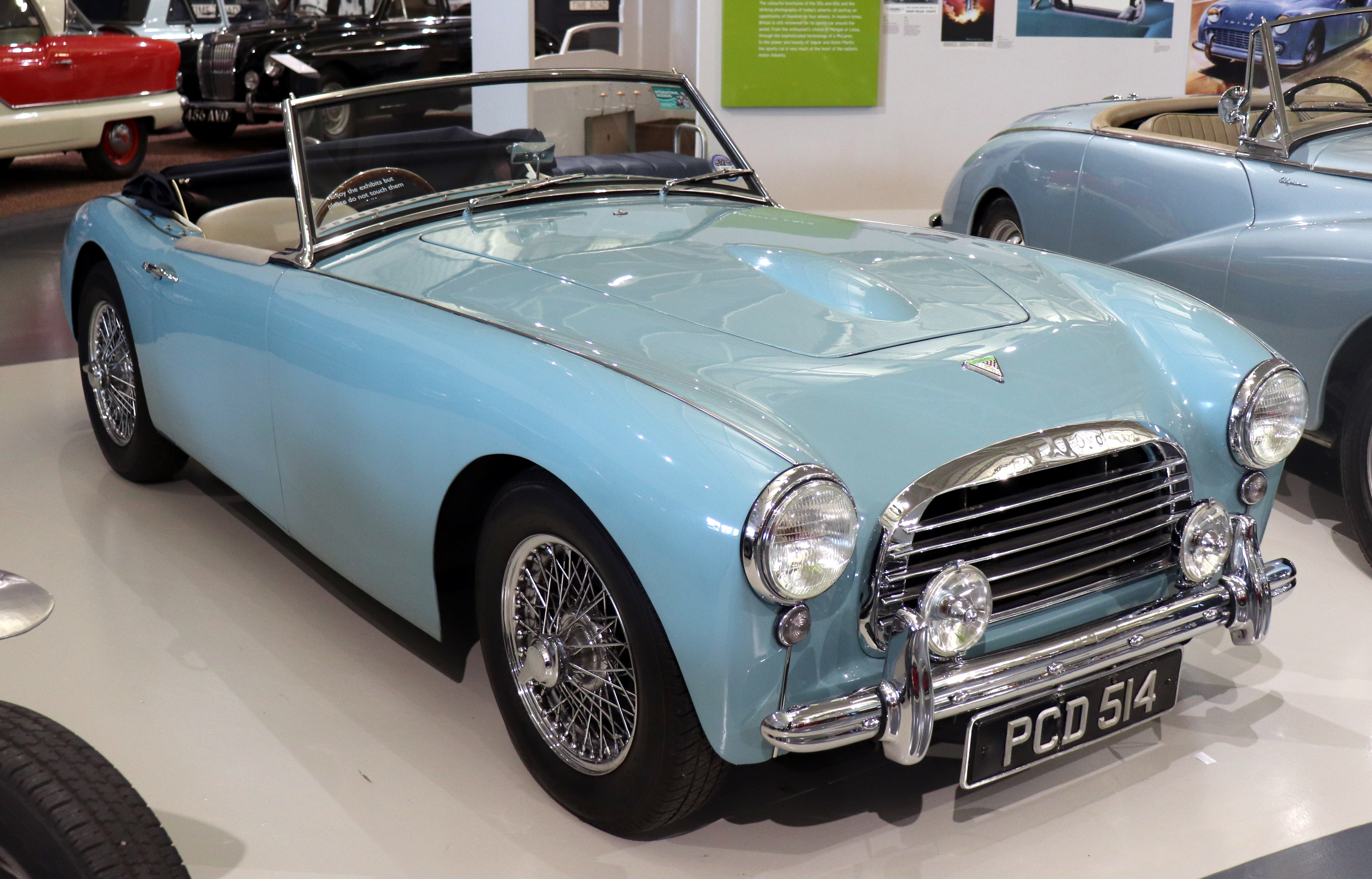
- 1954 open two-seater

Overview
- Manufacturer: Swallow, a subsidiary of the T.I. Group
- Production: 1954–1955
- Designer: Frank Rainbow Norman Oliver Hodgetts Senior Automotive Designer was brought into Helliwell's to design the Swallow Doretti as the other designers only had experience with aero design he worked alongside Frank Rainbow

Body and chassis
- Body style: 2 seat drop head coupé; 2 seat fixed head coupé (prototype)
- Layout: F/R
- Related: Triumph TR2

Powertrain
- Engine: 1,991 cc (121.5 cu in) Standard wet liner inline-four engine
- Transmission: 4-speed manual. Optional overdrive

Dimensions
- Wheelbase: 95 in (2,413 mm)
- Length: 156 in (3,962 mm)
- Width: 61 in (1,549 mm)
- Height: 52.5 in (1,334 mm)
- Kerb weight: 17 cwt, 1,904 lb (864 kg) open two-seater

The Swallow Doretti is a British sports car built between 1954 and 1955 on a custom Swallow Coachbuilding Company chassis using Triumph TR2 mechanicals. It was intended for the US market, as a more refined affordable two-seater than what was available there at that time.

== Swallow ==
The car was built by the Swallow Coachbuilding Company Ltd., a Tube Investments Group subsidiary bought for its 1935–1946 association with Jaguar's prewar motorcycle sidecars.

== Name ==
The Doretti name was derived from Dorothy Deen, who managed the Western US distributorship, Cal Sales. The trade mark logo and Doretti name are in the ownership of Canadian Peter Schömer. He is building a new limited edition sports car called the Doretti TR250 'Corsa Veloce' using the Ferrari TR 250 chassis and engine from 1957.

== Design ==
The car was designed in-house by engineer Frank Rainbow, and produced in the T.I. factory at The Airport, Walsall, Staffordshire, England.

Some observers find similarities between the Doretti and the Ferrari 166MM 'Barchetta' and Austin-Healey 100. Based on the Triumph TR2, the Doretti had much improved stability, its track was 3 in (76 mm) wider, and its wheelbase 7 in (178 mm) longer. The Doretti had a tubular Reynolds 531 manganese–molybdenum, medium-carbon steel chassis. Reynolds was another member of the T.I. Group. The double-skinned body had an inner structural skin made of steel and an aluminium outer skin. The engine was a 1,991 cc (121.5 cu in) tandard wet liner inline-four. Most cars were supplied with Laycock-de Normanville electric epicyclic overdrive and were capable of 100 mph.

A total 276 Mk Is were made, including a single fixed head coupe version. Three prototype Mk IIs were also produced. Called Sabres, they had a stiffer chassis and better weight distribution.

The Doretti was the only car that the T.I. Group ever built under the Swallow name. Production stopped in 1955 when the parent company T.I. Group changed policy. Allegedly, pressure placed on T.I. directors by the British motor industry, most notably Jaguar, claimed that Doretti production created a conflict of interest for T.I. by giving Swallow an advantage over other customers in buying its products.

== Performance ==
A car with overdrive tested by the British magazine The Motor in 1954 had a top speed of 100.2 mph (161.3 km/h) and could accelerate from 0-60 mph (97 km/h) in 12.3 seconds. A fuel consumption of 27.9 miles per imperial gallon (10.1 L/100 km; 23.2 mpg_{‑US}) was recorded. The test car cost £1,158 including taxes.

The standard version without overdrive cost £1,102. At the time a Triumph TR2 cost £887.

== Gallery ==
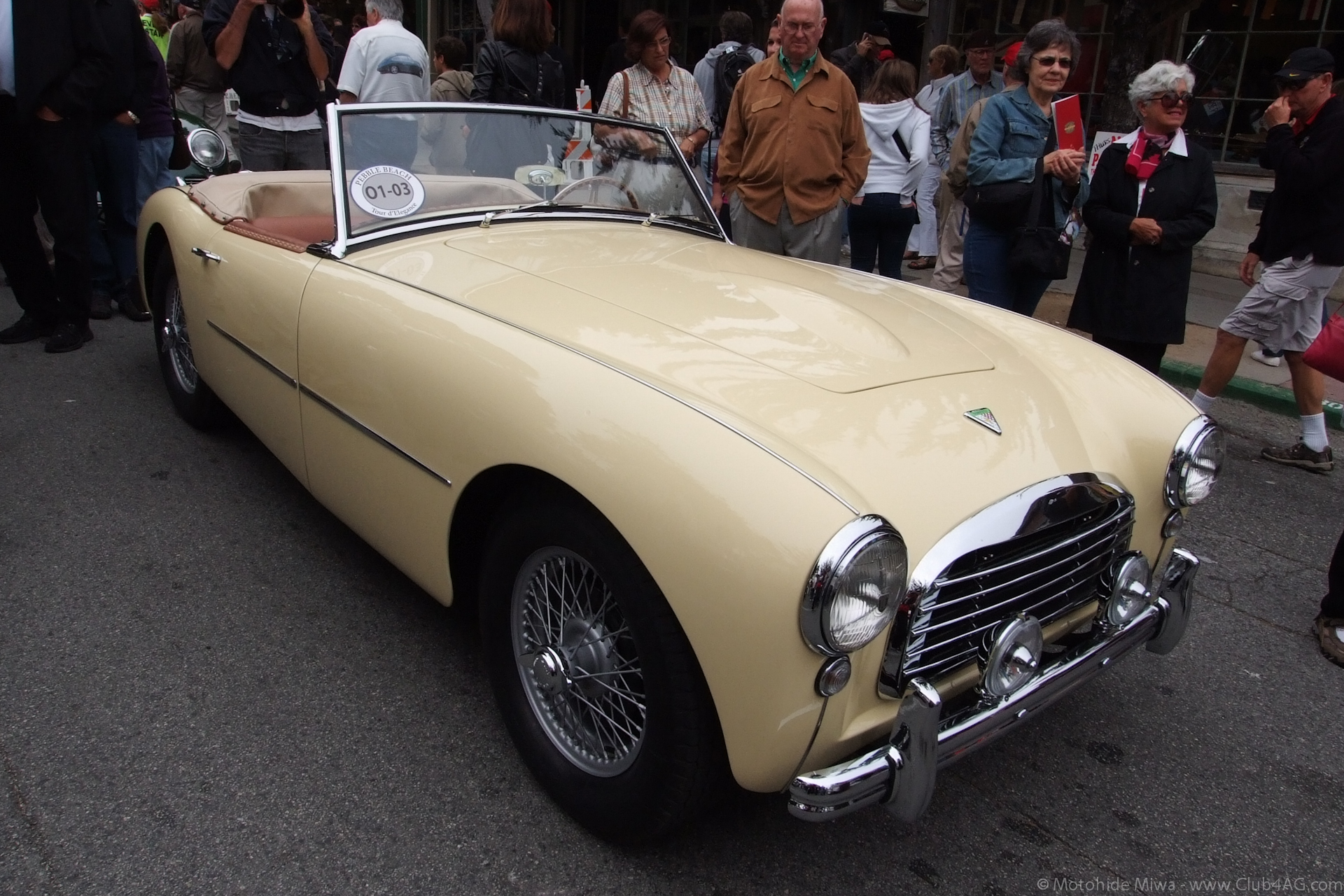
1954 roadster

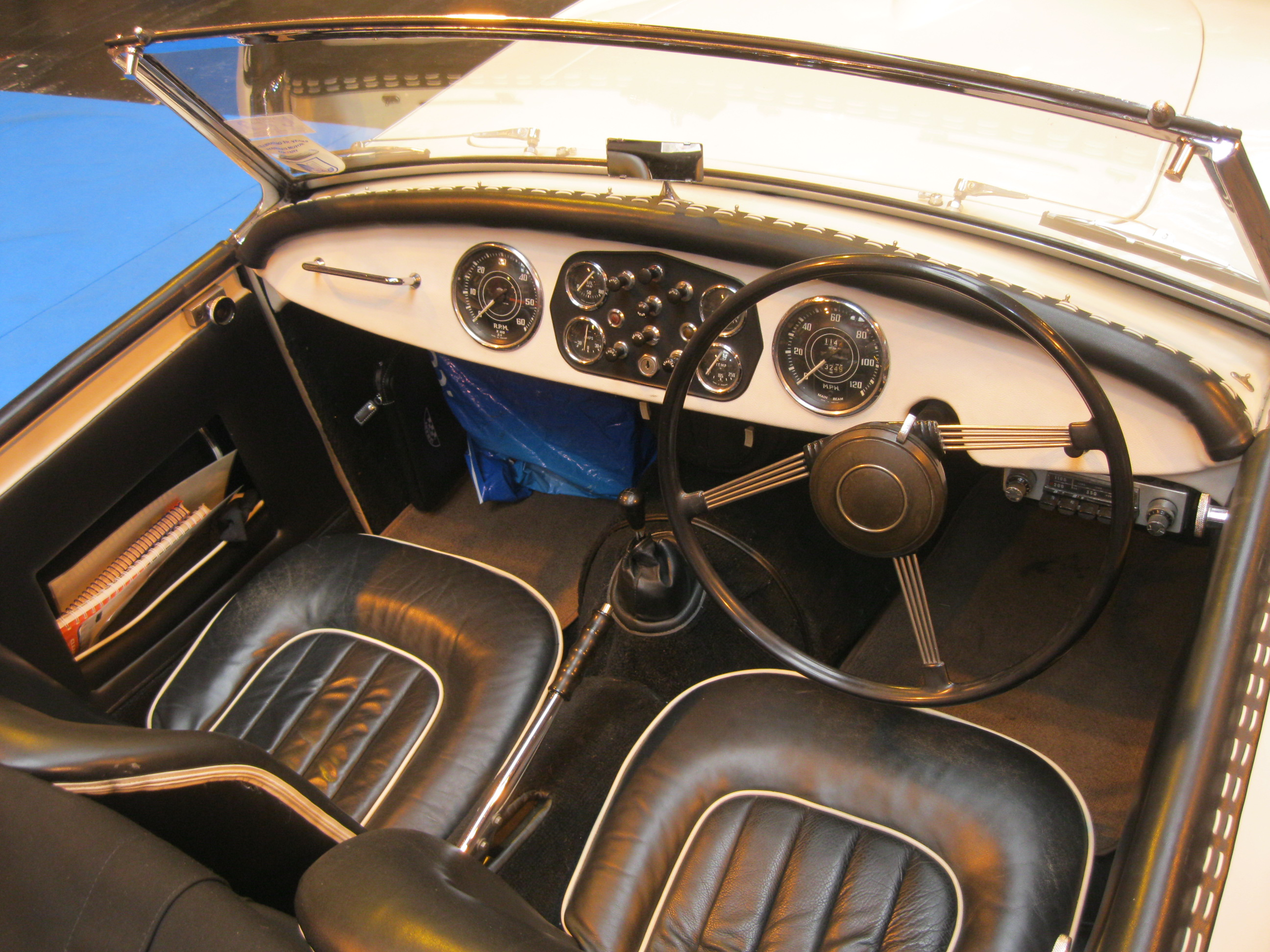
Interior

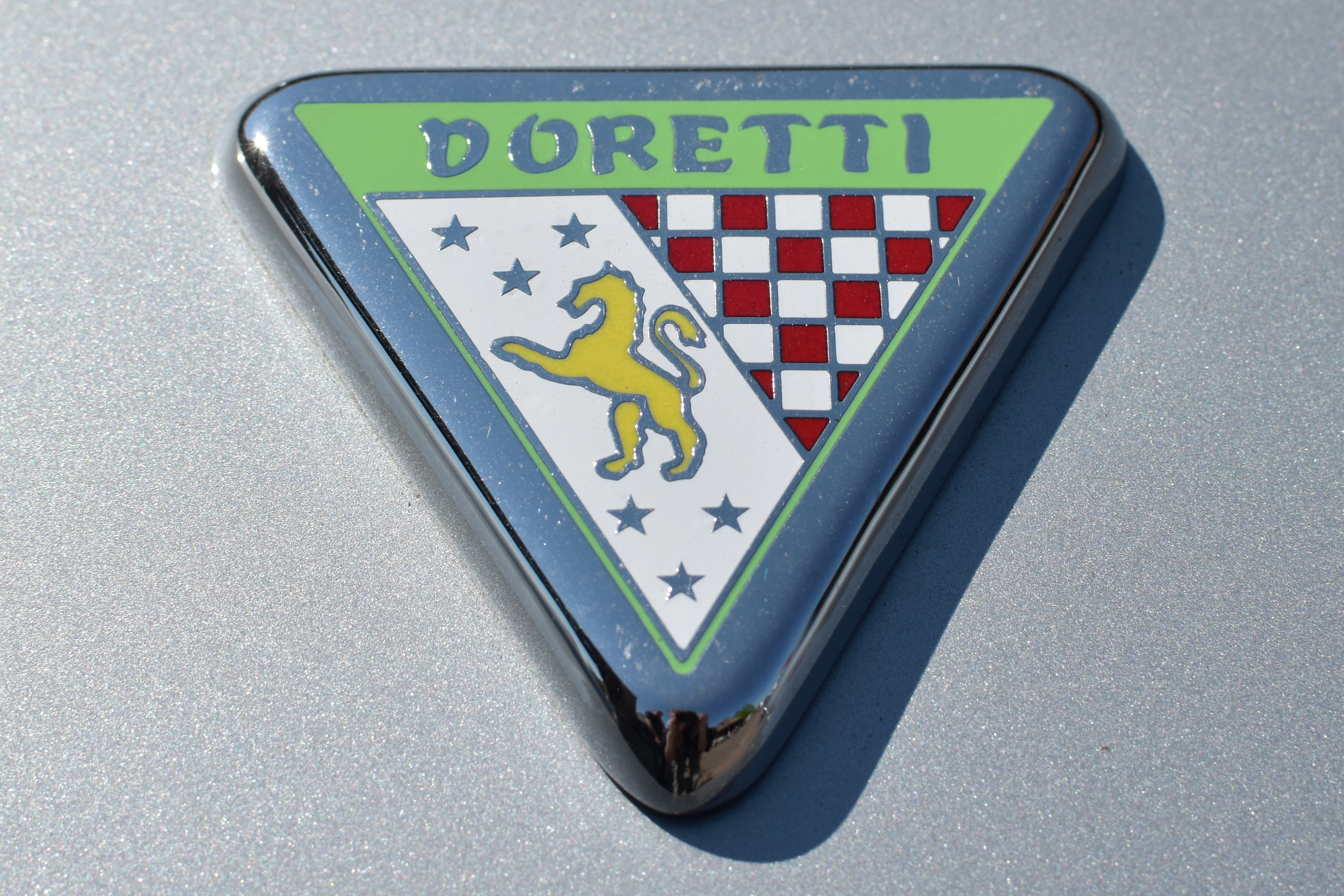
Doretti badge

== See also ==
- List of car manufacturers of the United Kingdom
