= John Black (businessman) =

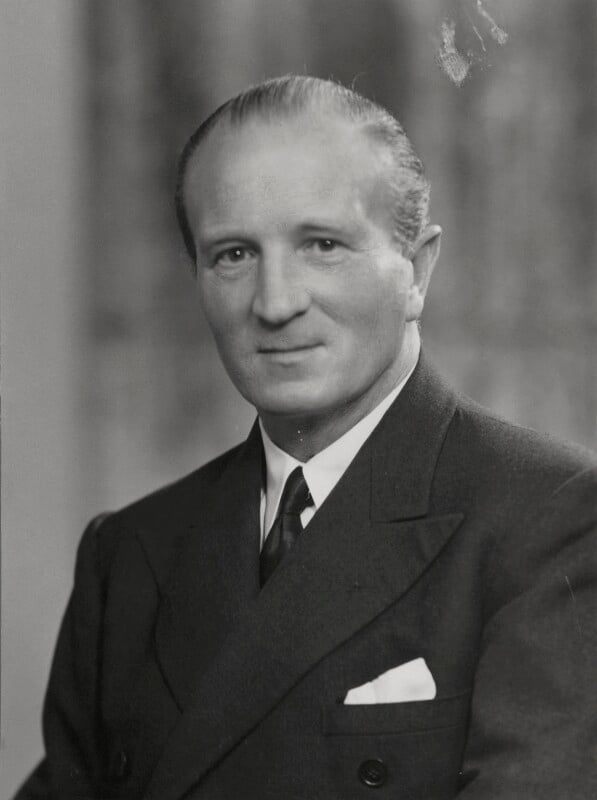
Black in 1943

Sir John Paul Black (10 February 1895 – 24 December 1965) held several senior positions in the British motor industry including chairman of Standard-Triumph.

He was born in Kingston upon Thames on 10 February 1895 the fourth son of Ellen (Smith) and her husband John George Black, a clerk in the Public Record Office now Britain's national archives. He studied law at the University of London. During the First World War he served first in the Royal Navy Volunteer Reserve before transferring to the Royal Tank Regiment, where he gained the rank of captain.

== Hillman ==
After the war he joined Hillman Motor Car Company as sales manager in 1918 and was appointed a director in 1919. In 1921 Black married Daisy Hillman one of the daughters of owner William Hillman, the marriage was dissolved in 1939. He was appointed joint managing director alongside his brother-in-law Spencer Wilks, who had married one of Daisy's sisters. When Hillman amalgamated with Humber and Commer in 1928 Black joined their boards.

== Standard ==
He resigned his posts in July 1929 after Hillman fell under the control of the Rootes brothers and in September 1929 took up a new position at the Standard Motor Company. He was appointed Standard's joint managing director (with founder R W Maudslay) in September 1933. Maudslay died little more than a year later.

With the possibility of war again looming he enthusiastically backed the government scheme for shadow factories and managed two, at Banner Lane and Canley built by the government for the manufacture of aero engines and for aircraft.

In July 1941 Black was appointed chairman of the Joint Aero Engine Committee. He performed so well he was given a knighthood in July 1943 and thereafter he insisted that his title be used by all staff and employees. At the end of the war he organised Standard's purchase of Triumph. Alick S. Dick took control of day-to-day operations in 1953 and Black was appointed chairman of Standard-Triumph. He was injured in late 1953 in an accident when being given a demonstration of the Swallow Doretti. His fellow board members believed this affected his judgment and he was forced to resign in January 1954, officially because of his health.

In December 1954 Black accepted an appointment as deputy chairman of Enfield Cables Ltd. In his retirement he took up farming. He died suddenly at Cheadle Hospital, Cheadle, Cheshire on 24 December 1965 at the age of 70.

Black married a second time in 1943 to Alicia Joan Pears Linton, daughter of the Bishop of Persia later rector of Handsworth, with whom he had three sons. The Oxford Dictionary of National Biography incorrectly identifies both father and daughter.

Shortly after Black died in 1965, Alick Dick, his successor at the helm of Standard-Triumph, recalled Black with obvious affection as an "extrovert and exciting, if somewhat controversial personality". Recalling cars introduced under Black such as the Triumph TR2, Dick candidly stated that "the emphasis was on the chassis [and on the car's performance] rather than the body. [Also] typical [of Black] was the fact that all his cars had very little leg room and lots of head room because he was a six footer with short legs".
