= Triumph Renown =

Motor vehicle made in England

Triumph 1800 Triumph 2000 TDA Triumph Renown
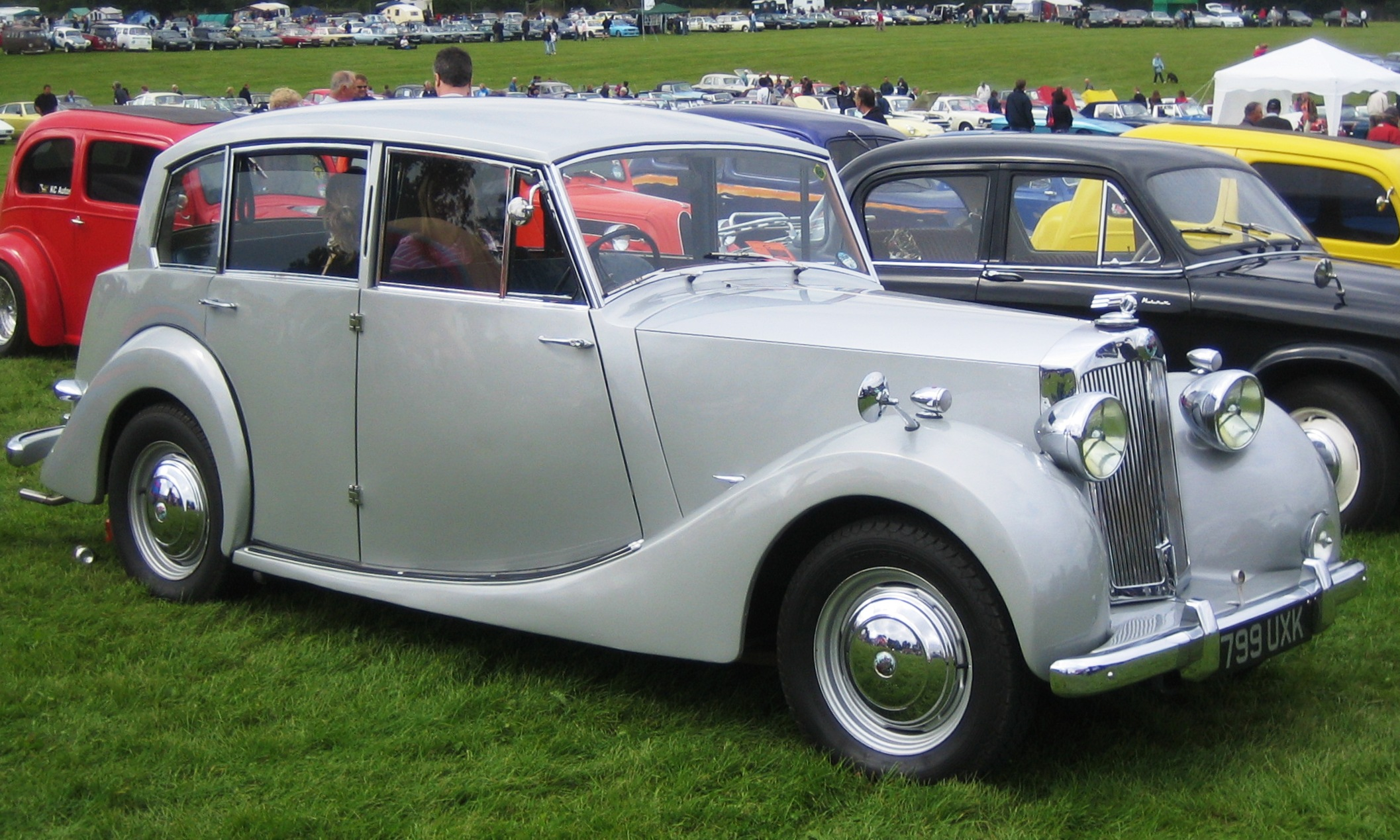
- Triumph Renown saloon

Overview
- Manufacturer: Standard Motor Company
- Production: 1946–1954; 15,491 made

Body and chassis
- Body style: 4 door saloon, limousine.

Powertrain
- Engine: 1766 cc or 2088 cc OHV I4
- Transmission: 3-speed manual

Dimensions
- Wheelbase: 108 in (2,743 mm) 1800, 2000 and Renown; 111 in (2,819 mm) TDC and limousine
- Length: 168 in (4,267 mm) 2000; 178 in (4,521 mm) Renown; 181 in (4,597 mm) TDC and limousine
- Width: 64 in (1,626 mm)
- Height: 65 in (1,651 mm)

The Triumph Renown is the name given to the large saloon car made by the Triumph Motor Company from 1949 to 1954, but it is actually part of a three-car series that includes the 1800, 2000, and Renown models. Together with the Triumph Roadster, they were the first vehicles to carry the Triumph badge following the company's takeover by the Standard Motor Company.

== Bodywork ==
The cars were distinctively styled in the later 1930s vogue for Razor Edge coachwork used in the 1940s by others including Austin for its big Sheerline. The six light (featuring three side windows on each side) design and the thin C pillars at the rear of the passenger cabin anticipated the increased window areas that would become a feature of British cars during the 1960s. The car's side profile resembled that of the contemporary Bentley Mark VI saloons, which some felt was more than a coincidence. Similar styling subsequently appeared on the smaller Triumph Mayflower. The Managing Director of the Standard Motor Company at that time, Sir John Black, commissioned the design of the Razoredge saloon. There has been much discussion over the years as to exactly which designers of that period were responsible for the styling but it is very clear from the records that Sir John drove the production forward and used the Triumph name from the prewar Triumph company that had been bought by the Standard Motor Company.

The body was built by Mulliners of Birmingham in the traditional coachbuilder's method of sheet metal over a wooden frame. The principal panels were constructed not from steel, which was in short supply in the wake of the Second World War, but from aluminium. It had been used extensively for aircraft manufacture during the war, which had taken place in a number of car plants (known at the time as "shadow factories") in the English Midlands. By the mid-1950s, aluminium had become the more expensive metal, which may have hastened the Renown's demise.

== Triumph 1800 Town and Country Saloon (1946–1949) ==
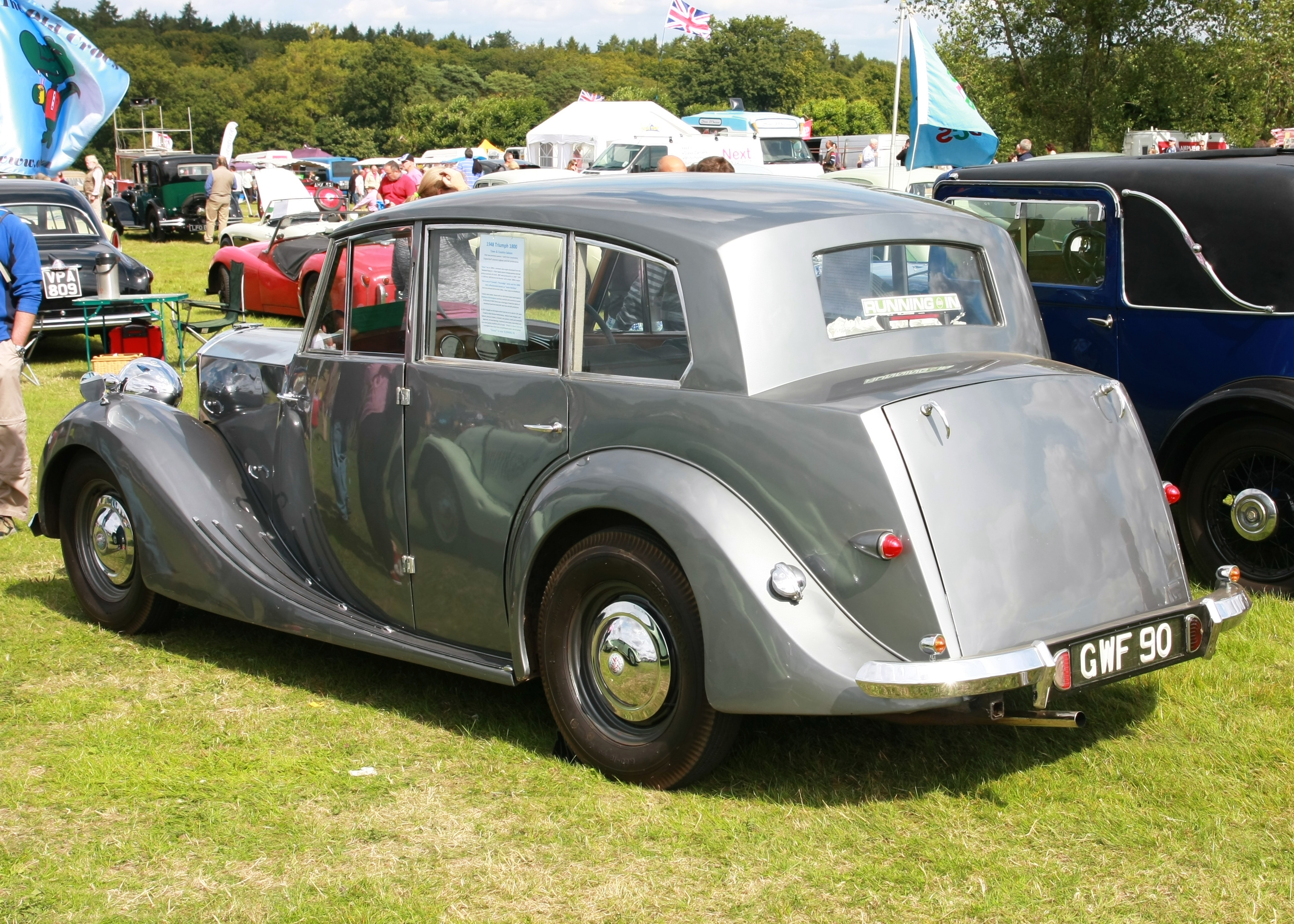
1948 Triumph 1800 Town and Country

The 1776 cc, 65 bhp (48 kW) engine and the gearbox for the 1800 came from the pre-war Standard Flying Fourteen (also built 1945–1948). The chassis was fabricated from tubular steel and was a lengthened 108 in (2,743 mm) version of the one on the Roadster with which it also shared its transverse leaf spring front suspension. The cars were well fitted out with leather seats and a wooden dashboard.

A total of 4000 were produced. It cost £1425 including purchase tax.

== Triumph 2000 TDA (1949) ==
The 2000 Type TDA was only produced for one year and was essentially a Triumph 1800. The front independent suspension used a transverse leaf spring.

The car used the larger 2088 cc four-cylinder engine with a single Solex carburettor as fitted to the Standard Vanguard. The engine produced 68 bhp (51 kW) at 4200 rpm. The 3-speed gearbox with column shift also came from the Vanguard and had synchromesh on all the forward ratios. There was an independent suspension at the front and a solid axle and half-elliptic leaf springs in the rear. Lockheed hydraulic brakes with 9 in (229 mm) drums were fitted.

2000 were produced.

== Triumph Renown Mk I TDB (1949–1952) ==
The car was renamed the Renown in October 1949. It had an entirely new chassis based on the Standard Vanguard with pressed steel sections replacing the tubes previously used. The front suspension changed to coil springing. Although the 3-speed column change transmission was retained, from June 1950 an overdrive unit was offered as an option. Inside there was a new instrument layout.

A Renown tested by the British magazine The Motor in 1950. They recorded a top speed of 75.0 mph (120.7 km/h) and a 0–60 mph (97 km/h) acceleration time of 24.3 seconds. A fuel consumption of 23.9 miles per imperial gallon (11.8 L/100 km; 19.9 mpg_{‑US}) was recorded. The test car cost £991 including taxes.

Of the 6501 produced, fewer than 100 are known to have survived.

== Triumph Renown Limousine (1951–1954) ==
In 1951, a limousine version was announced with an extra 3 in (76 mm) in the wheelbase. A glass partition was placed behind the driver, separating the front and back of the car. A radio and heater were fitted as standard.

A limousine with overdrive tested by The Motor magazine in 1952 had a top speed of 77.5 mph (124.7 km/h) slightly quicker than they had recorded two years earlier for the saloon and could accelerate from 0–60 mph (97 km/h) in 25.0 seconds. The reported fuel consumption was 21.6 miles per imperial gallon (13.1 L/100 km; 18.0 mpg_{‑US}). The test car cost £1440 including taxes.

A total of 190 were made, of which only a few remain.

== Triumph Renown Mk II TDC (1952–1954) ==
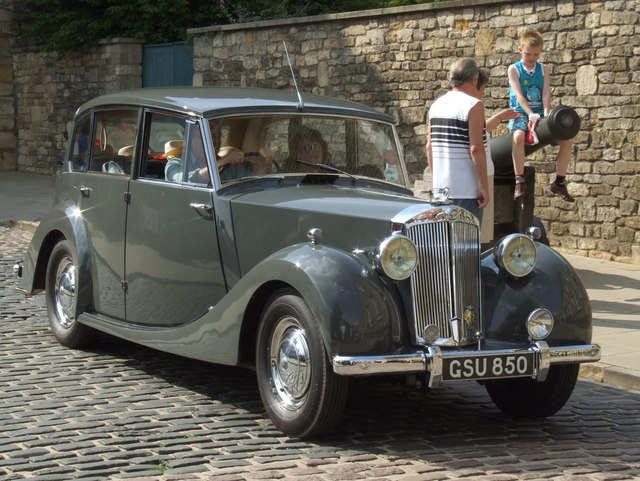
1952 Triumph Renown

The final version of the Renown used the longer-wheelbase chassis from the limousine. It is easily distinguished from the earlier cars by virtue of the push button door handles and the wider rear window.

Of the 2800 produced, only 150 remain worldwide.

== Demise and replacement ==
There was no direct replacement Triumph saloon following the end of Renown production. A badge-engineered version of the Standard Vanguard Phase III intended to be called the Triumph Renown was built with a version of the upright Triumph radiator grille and the Triumph "world" badges, but shortly before the model's launch in August 1956 it was decided to badge it as the Standard Vanguard Sportsman instead.

== Owner's club ==
The Triumph Razoredge Owner's Club Ltd, formed in 1975, provides support to some of the remaining Razoredge saloons. The Club is unable to supply Triumph parts to the USA and Canada due to insurance costs of supplying North America.

As of 2016, the Club knows of around 250 of these cars distributed worldwide. The later two series of cars with chassis numbers commencing TDB and TDC have survived better than the earlier two variants. This may be due to the commonality of most of the mechanical parts with the Standard Vanguard which was produced during the same period. These cars provide an elegant sedate motoring experience. Those that were fitted with the Laycock de Normanville overdrive are able to cruise at around 55 to 60 MPH and return a fuel consumption of about 25 to 27 MPG.

== Die-cast models ==
- Dinky Toys modelled the Renown in 1:48 scale in the 1950s.
- Lansdowne produced a model in the first decade of the 21st century to a scale of 1:43.
