= William Lyons =

Co-founder of Jaguar Cars (1901–1985)

Sir William Lyons
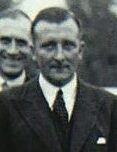
- Born: 4 September 1901; Blackpool, England
- Died: 8 February 1985 (aged 83); Warwickshire, England
- Other name: "Mr. Jaguar"
- Known for: Co-founder of Jaguar Cars
- Spouse: Greta Brown (m. 1924)
- Children: 3

Sir William Lyons (4 September 1901 – 8 February 1985), known as "Mr. Jaguar", was with fellow motorcycle enthusiast William Walmsley, the co-founder in 1922 of the Swallow Sidecar Company, which became Jaguar Cars Limited after the Second World War.

== Early life and career ==
Lyons was born in Blackpool, son of Irish immigrant William Lyons, who owned a musical instrument shop, and his wife Minnie Barcroft, the daughter of a mill owner. After attending Arnold School, Lyons obtained an engineering apprenticeship at Crossley Motors in Manchester, where he also studied at the technical school. He left Crossley in 1919 to work as a salesman at the Sunbeam dealers Brown and Mallalieu in Blackpool.

== Motorcycles ==
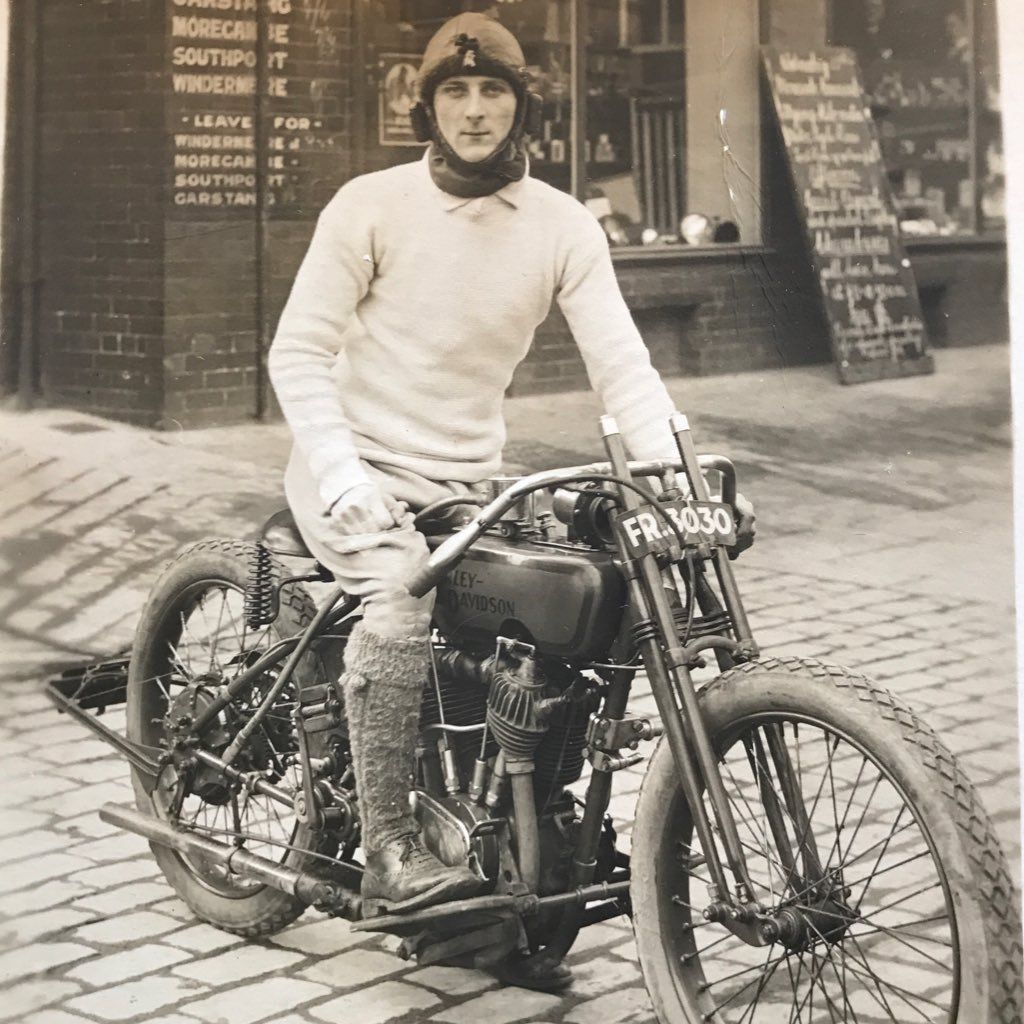
William Lyons on his Harley Davidson "FR 3030" around 1920.

In 1921, Lyons met William Walmsley who was converting army-surplus motorcycles for civilian use and making sidecars. Lyons admired the sidecars and bought one. Lyons and Walmsley obtained from their fathers a substantial £500 bank guarantee to go into business. Their plans were delayed as Lyons was under the legal age, but on his 21st birthday he formed a partnership with Walmsley.

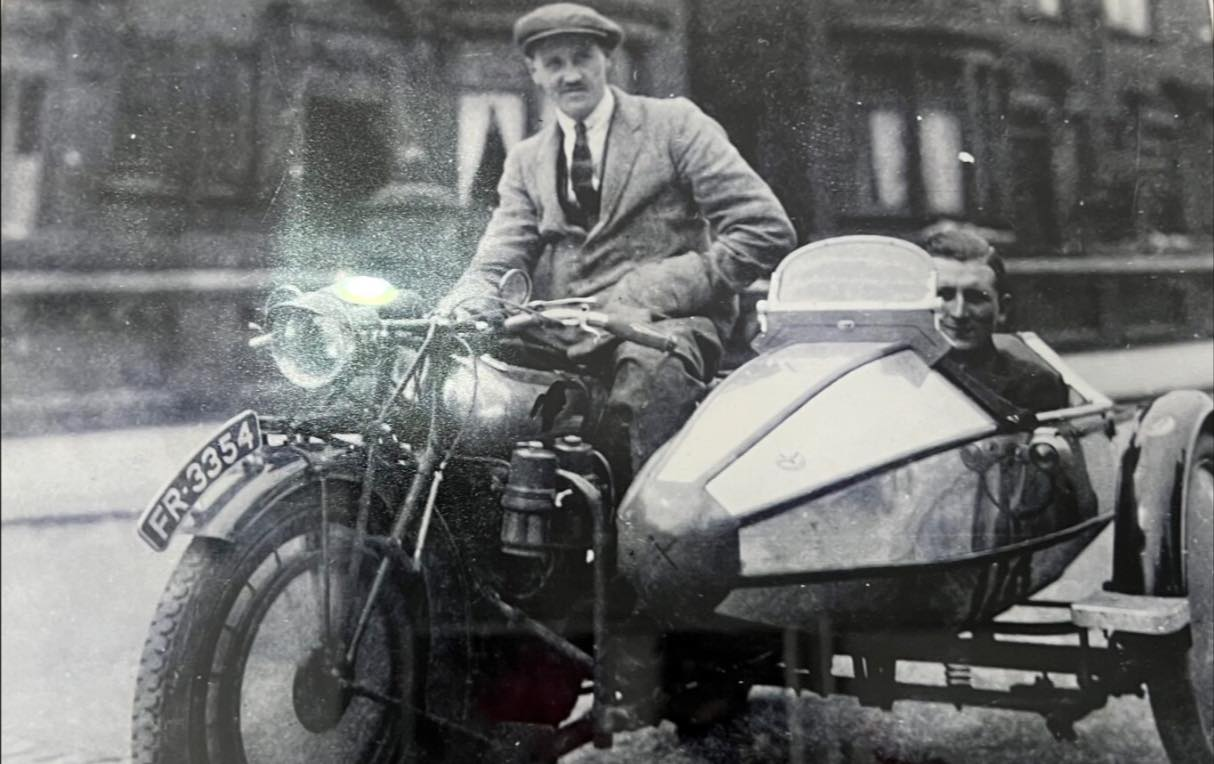
Walmsley and Lyons (sitting) with the Model no. 1 Swallow sidecar on King Edward avenue in Blackpool, where they grew up and engineering facilities were initially. The motorcycle is a Brough Superior SS80.

It was called Swallow Sidecars and had a staff of "three men and a boy". The company manufactured stylish sidecars, but after 1927 made increasing numbers of low cost coach-built cars, especially the Austin Seven Swallow which the Blackpool factory produced at the rate of 12 per week. Following several moves to larger premises in Blackpool, in 1928 Lyons moved the company (and his family) to Coventry. His family home was Woodside, Gibbet Hill, on the fringe of the city. Production increased to 50 cars each week. In 1931, they began selling the SS1, and in 1933 the company name was changed to SS Cars Ltd. The following year, William Walmsley left the company.

== Jaguar ==
The first "Jaguar" model was offered in 1935, and after World War II, Lyons changed the company name to Jaguar to avoid the unfortunate connotations with the Nazi SS "Schutzstaffel". Armstrong Siddeley allowed Lyons to use the Jaguar name from their successful aircraft engine range, such was the camaraderie of the car industry at the time.

During the War vehicle production was switched to aircraft manufacture and repair, but engineering development did continue. Some secretive military projects were undertaken but most importantly for the future of the company, Lyons and his engineering team headed by William Heynes chief engineer worked on a new engine which was to power his vision of a mass-produced sporting saloon car. The XK engine was completed in 1948 and launched in a (supposedly) one-off concept sports car to help draw attention to it. This succeeded far better than was envisaged and both became an overnight sensation, globally. The XK engine went on to power all Jaguars until the introduction of the series 3 E Type introduced the Jaguar V12 engine in 1971, while the XJ6 continued in production until 1992 with the 4.2 litre version of the XK engine. The sports car, XK120, went into full production too and led to a string of attention-grabbing (and profitable) sports cars which led to international sporting success (most notably at Le Mans) and helped put the name of Jaguar Cars and Coventry on the world map. But Lyons main focus was on the saloon car which he continued to develop until his last and proudest achievement, the XJ6 of 1968.

During his time as managing director of Jaguar, Lyons could be best described as 'autocratic' and kept a tight rein on the company. It is said that board meetings were rare until the 1960s. He was responsible for the styling of every new model introduced (although the C-type, D-type, E-type and XJ-S were designed by Malcolm Sayer). This was remarkable, as Sir William was not a trained engineer, and designed primarily using full scale 3-D mockups, which were continually adjusted by craftsmen working under his instructions. Undoubtedly one of his other great skills was to pick the highly accomplished team that was to remain loyal to him for so long. William Heynes, Claude Baily, Walter Hassan, Tom Jones, and many others all contributed to create a strong engineering team. Although he had no direct involvement with its design, allegedly Lyons was shown the finished final prototype of the XJ40 shortly before his death in 1985 and was said to be "approving" of what was the replacement for the first generation XJ6.

Lyons gave his permission, in 1956, for the formation of The Jaguar Drivers' Club, an owners club for the cars his company produced. The Jaguar Drivers' Club is the only owners club to ever be officially sanctioned by Lyons and the company itself and is still in existence today serving many thousands of members.

== Later years ==
In 1956, Lyons was knighted for his services to British industry and for the fine export performance of the company. In 1966, faced with a strengthening global industry, he merged Jaguar with the British Motor Corporation (BMC) to form British Motor Holdings, which was later absorbed into British Leyland. Unfortunately the final years of Lyons tenure before he retired as managing director near the end of 1967, while remaining on as chairman, were a constant struggle against impossible odds to retain the identity and independence of his company, not least its engineering department. He retired completely to Wappenbury Hall in 1972, to play golf, travel, garden, and keep prize-winning Suffolk sheep and Jersey cattle on his farm estates at Wappenbury. His health declined fairly rapidly in retirement and the reemergence of his company under John Egan took place after his death. Despite this, Lyons remained in a consultative role to Jaguar until shortly before his death, and had participated in the styling of both the Jaguar XJS and Jaguar XJ40 during his retirement.

In 2025 “Sir Williams Lyons on Jaguar” was published. Originated and compiled by Giles Chapman and with a preface by Michael Quinn (Sir William’s grandson) it is the text from a speech Sir William gave in 1969 - an account in his own words of how he built up Jaguar and what made the car so special.

== Family ==
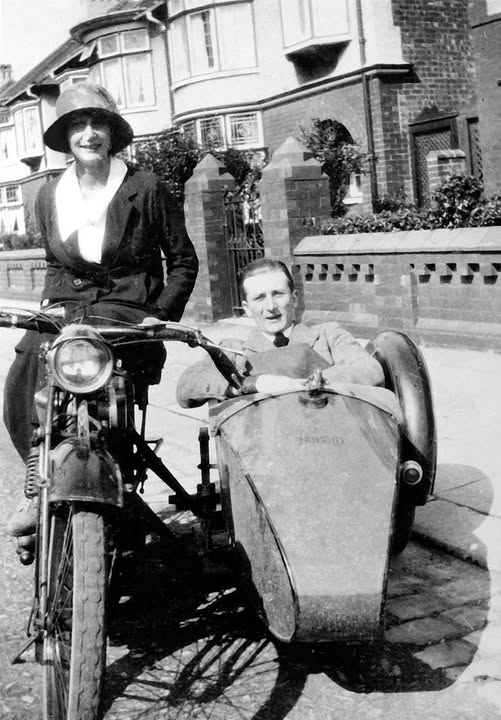
William and his wife Greta Brown, presumably in one of his sidecars.

Lyons married Greta Brown in 1924. They had three children; Patricia (b. 1927 d. 2025), John Michael (b. 1930, d. 1955), and Mary (b. 1937). Patricia married Leeds Jaguar-distributor and rally driver Ian Appleyard, and was his co-driver in many international rallies from 1951 to '56, mostly in an XK120 registered NUB 120, including the Alpine Rally, which they won three times. There were no children. Patricia remarried in 1962 and has two children by her second husband Norbert Quinn; Michael Quinn, and Jane Quinn. John Michael served briefly in REME, and then joined Jaguar as an apprentice but was killed in a road accident in France driving to the 1955 Le Mans 24-hours race. Mary married Guy Rimell (son of successful racehorse trainer Fred Rimell) and has three children; Katie, Tom and Mark. Sir William and Lady Lyons had an active and contented retirement with their beloved dogs, Sally, Peppie, Buttons.

== Death ==
Lyons died on 8 February 1985 at Wappenbury Hall, his home in Leamington Spa, Warwickshire, at the age of 83. His wife Greta, Lady Lyons, died the following year; they were both buried in St. John the Baptist churchyard close to their home.
