= SS Cars =

Predecessor company to Jaguar Cars Limited

S. S. Cars Limited
- The SS Cars badge
- Type: Public (January 1935)
- Industry: Automotive
- Predecessor: Swallow Coachbuilding Company Limited
- Founded: 2 September 1922 in Blackpool, England, incorporated 26 October 1933
- Founders: William Walmsley and William Lyons
- Fate: Continued as Jaguar Cars Limited on 23 March 1945
- Successor: Jaguar Cars Limited
- Headquarters: Coventry, England
- Key people: William Lyons
- Products: Automobiles and sidecars
- Brands: SS Jaguar (cars); Swallow (sidecars)

SS Cars was a British manufacturer of sports saloon cars from 1934 until wartime 1940, and from March 1935 of a limited number of open 2-seater sports cars. From September 1935, their new models displayed a new name: SS Jaguar. By then, its business, which was founded in 1922, was run by and largely owned by William Lyons. Lyons had been a partner with 1922 co-founder William Walmsley until Walmsley sold his shareholding in January 1935.

The company that owned the business, S. S. Cars Limited, (Note: S. S. Cars Limited (Swallow Road, Holbrook Lane, Coventry) was formed to take over that part of the business of the Swallow Coachbuilding Company Limited concerned with the manufacture and sale of S.S. motor-cars. Nominal capital £10,000 in £1 shares. New Companies Registered. The Times, Saturday, 28 October 1933; pg. 19; Issue 46587 S. S. Cars Limited technically commenced business on 1 February 1934, following its incorporation on 26 October 1933) bought the shares of Swallow Coachbuilding Limited as of 31 July 1934, and the Swallow company was liquidated before S. S. issued shares to the public in January 1935. This was the time when Walmsley finished selling his holding. (Note: Prospectus for the sale of shares S. S. Cars Limited "went public" in January 1935, selling shares previously held by or for Walmsley and Lyons. The shares were heavily oversubscribed. At that time, Lyons reported S. S. Cars had acquired Swallow Coachbuilding Company Limited as of 31 July 1934, and S. S. Cars' activities now included the manufacture of Swallow sidecars. S. S. Cars Limited. The Times, Thursday, 10 January 1935; pg. 16; Issue 46958) S. S. Cars Limited changed its name to Jaguar Cars Limited 23 March 1945.

== S. S. ==
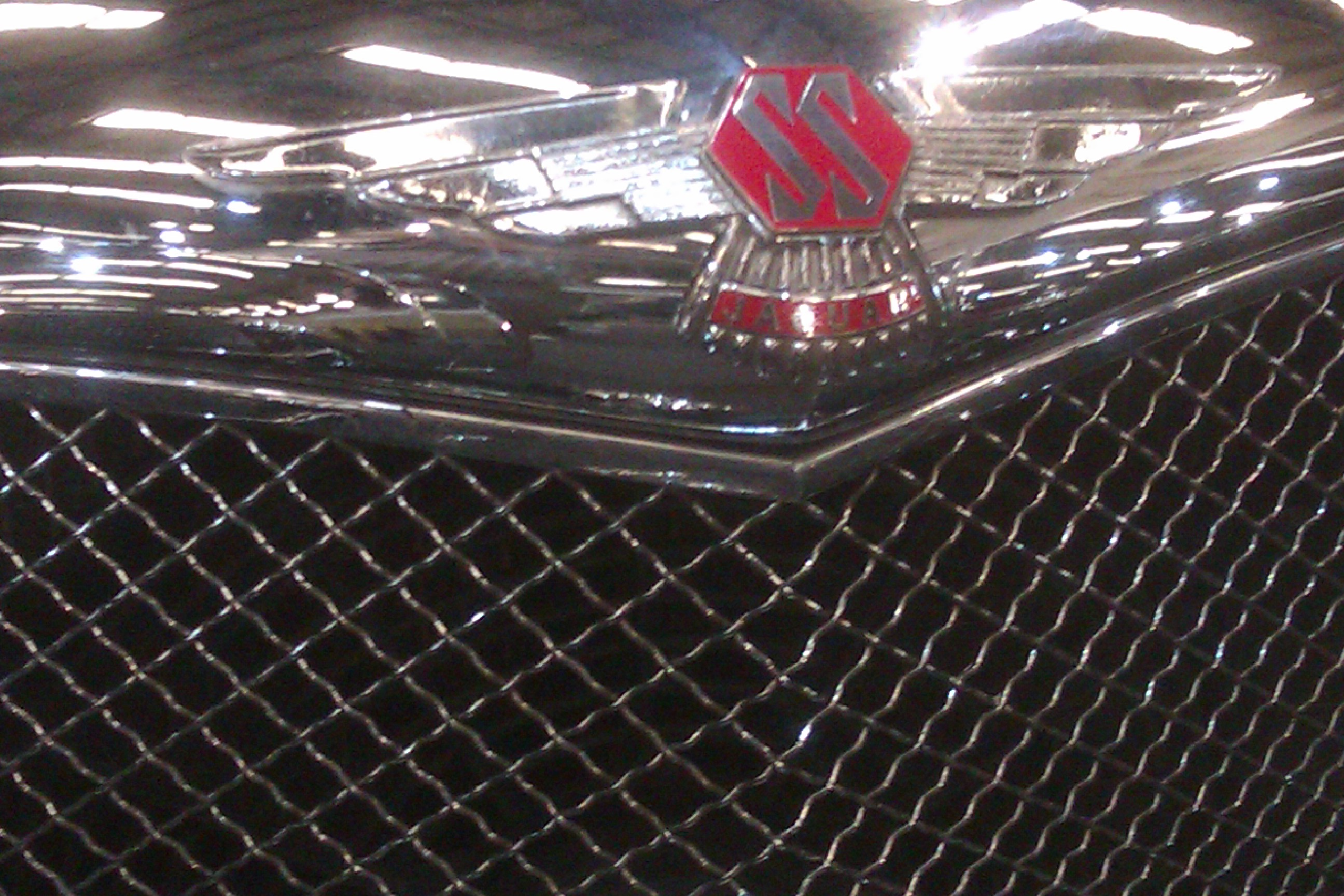
The S.S. badge on a front rear

There is doubt about the source of the SS name. Sir John Black of Standard-Triumph when asked said SS stood for Standard Swallow. William Lyons when asked was noncommittal, but he was at the time in the company of suppliers of chassis for his run of the mill production bodies. He concurred after the use of Standard chassis became exclusive.

The Swallow Sidecar Company, trading name for the company Walmsley & Lyons co-founded by William Lyons and William Walmsley, progressively developed into a coachbuilder from its 1922 start, first making stylish sidecars for motorcycles. In May 1927, Swallow advertised that it would make 2-seater bodies on Austin and Morris chassis and running gear supplied through any authorised dealer. Their first full page advertisement appeared in the Autocar magazine in October 1927 to fit with the Olympia Motor Show. The next year Swallow relocated to the heart of the British motor industry. In the winter of 1928–1929 they moved bit by bit from Cocker Street Blackpool to a disused munitions factory on a rutted track, the future Swallow Road, off Holbrook Lane, Foleshill, Coventry. They returned to Blackpool each year for the Works Day Out.

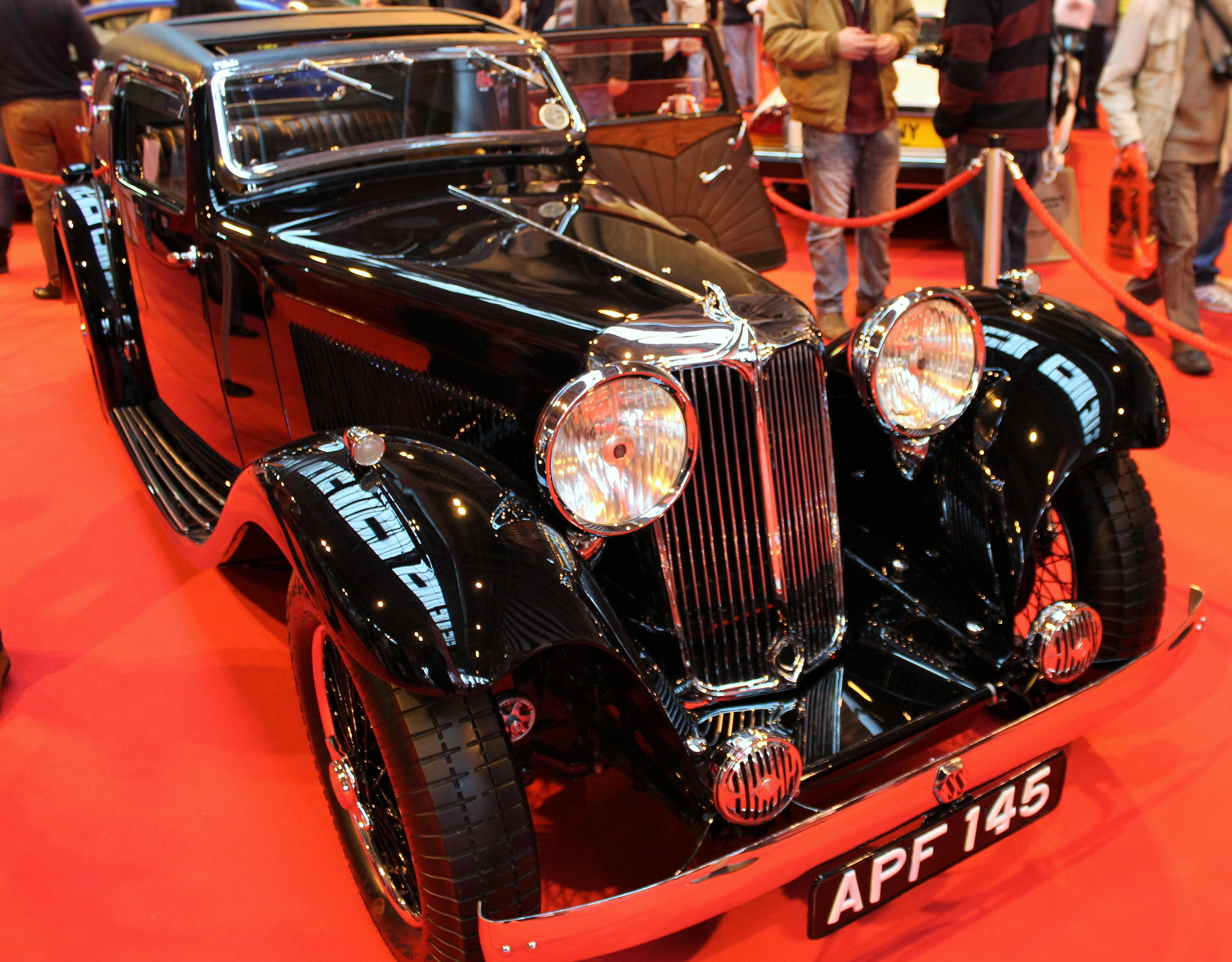
SS 1 built 1933. It has the production running boards and conventional wings

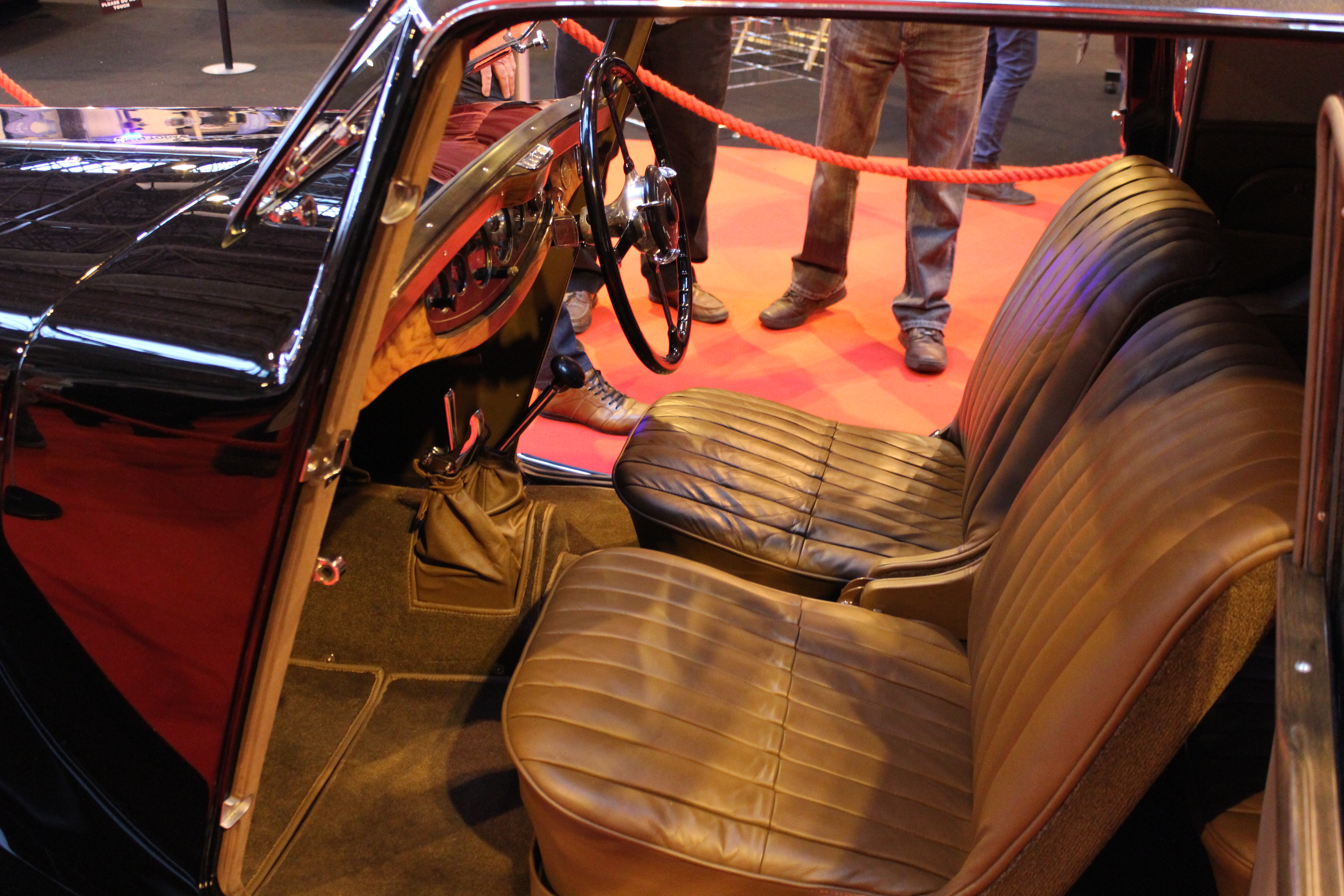
interior

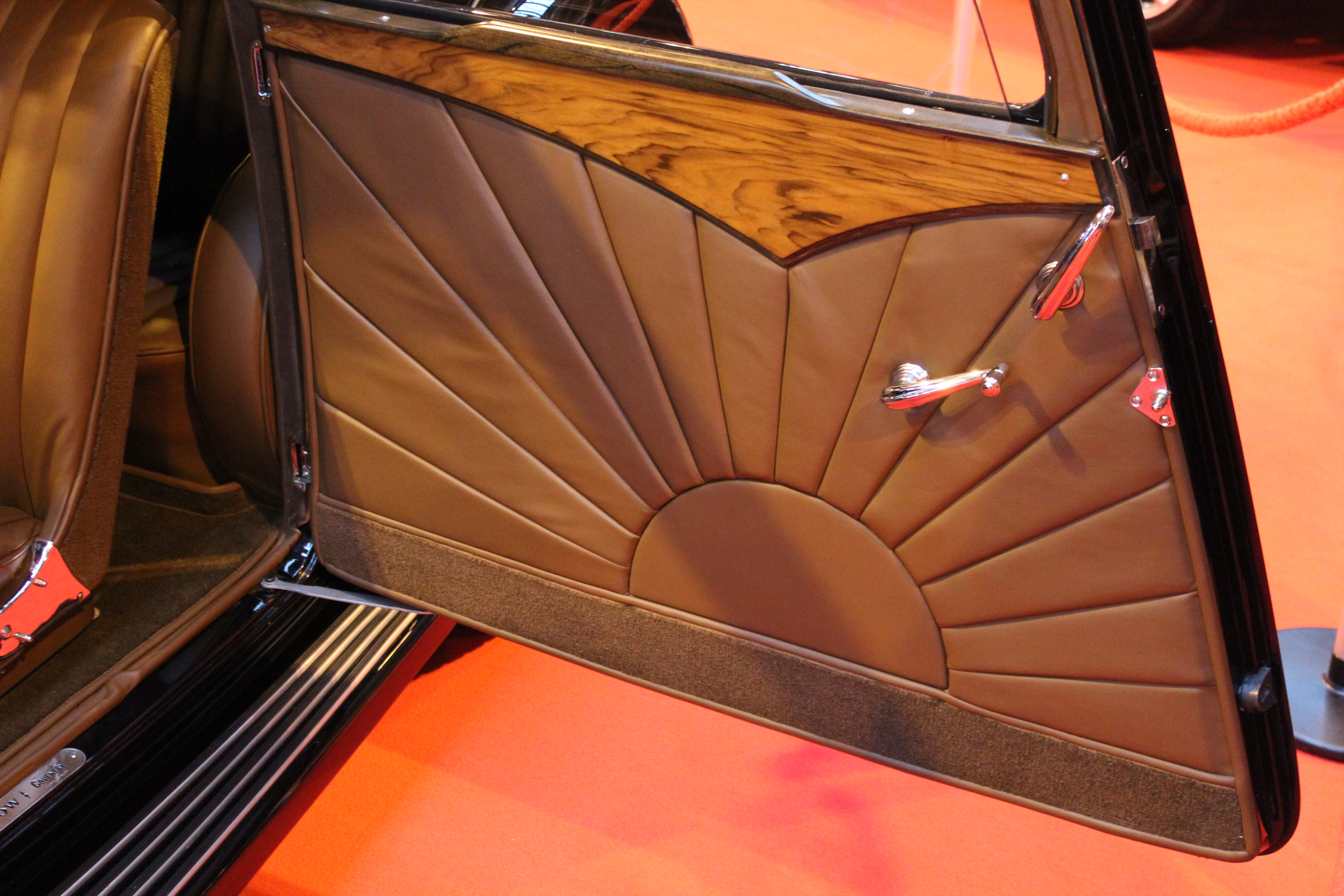
door interior

In 1929, John Black of Standard Motor Company and William Lyons teamed up to realise their long standing dream to produce a one of a kind sports car. This "First SS" was a sleek boat-tail open 2-seater. Its flowing design and streamlining pointed to an obvious attempt at making a fast car, possibly with the intention of venturing into racing. This car is believed to have been shipped to Australia in the late 1940s.

While the initial link with John Black's Standard was slowly developed, bodies continued to be built on Austin, Standard, Fiat and lastly Wolseley Hornet chassis. Nevertheless, at Motor Show time in October 1931, Swallow eventually launched a car of its own, the SS 1, and displayed a prototype, all while the aforementioned little Wolseley Hornet Special continued alongside.

It received favorable reviews upon its debut.

=== SS 1 and SS 2 ===
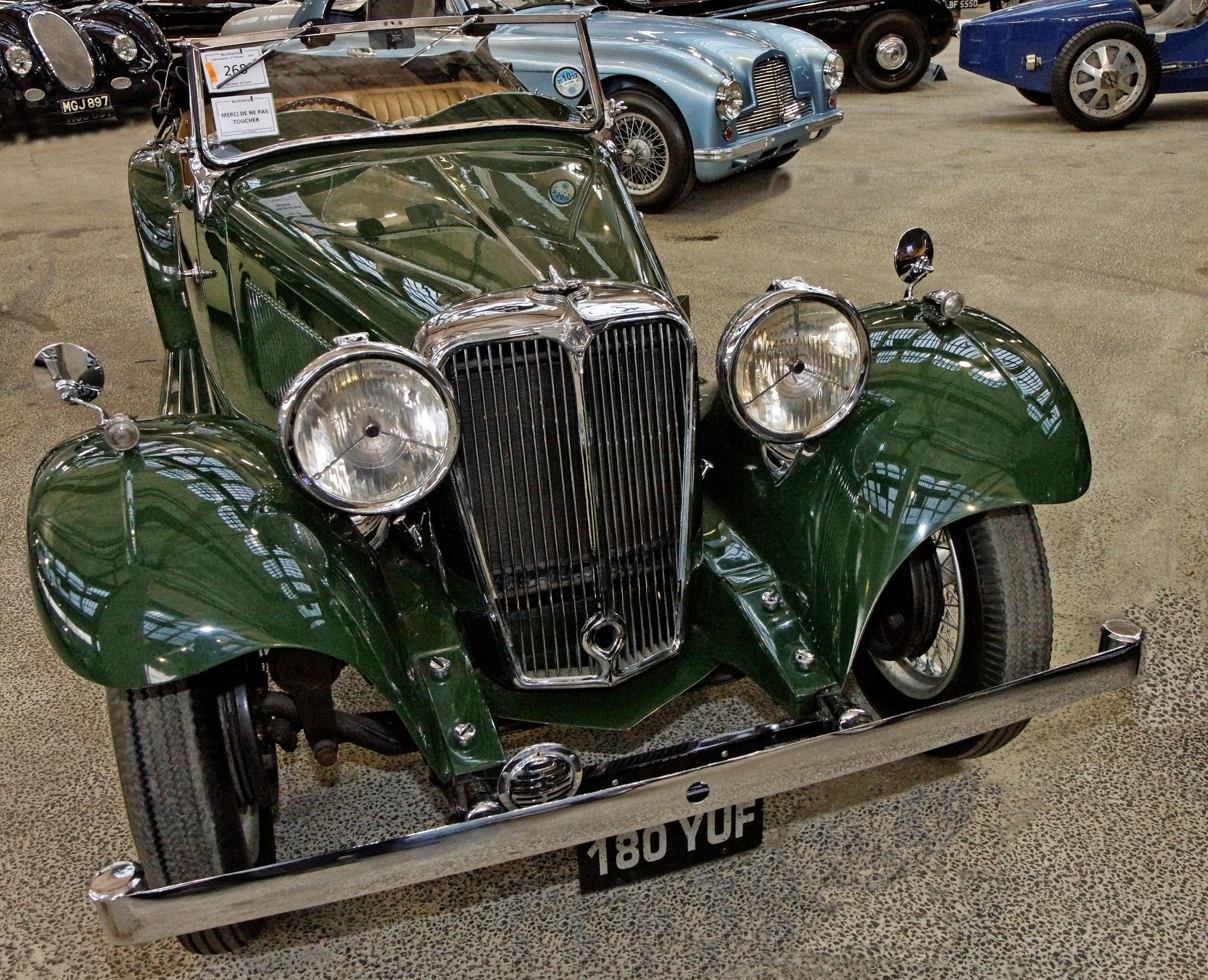
SS 1 tourer 1935

Under the guidance of the chairman, William Lyons, the company survived the depression years of the 1930s by making a series of beautifully styled cars offering exceptional value for money although some enthusiasts criticised them at the time for being "more show than go". The engines and chassis supplied by the Standard Motor Company were fitted with Swallow bodies styled under Lyons supervision.

The first of the SS range of cars available to the public was the 1932 SS 1 with 2-litre or 2½-litre side-valve, six-cylinder engine and the SS 2 with a four-cylinder 1-litre side-valve engine. Initially available as coupé or tourer a saloon was added in 1934, when the chassis was modified to be 2 inches (50 mm) wider.

=== SS 90 ===
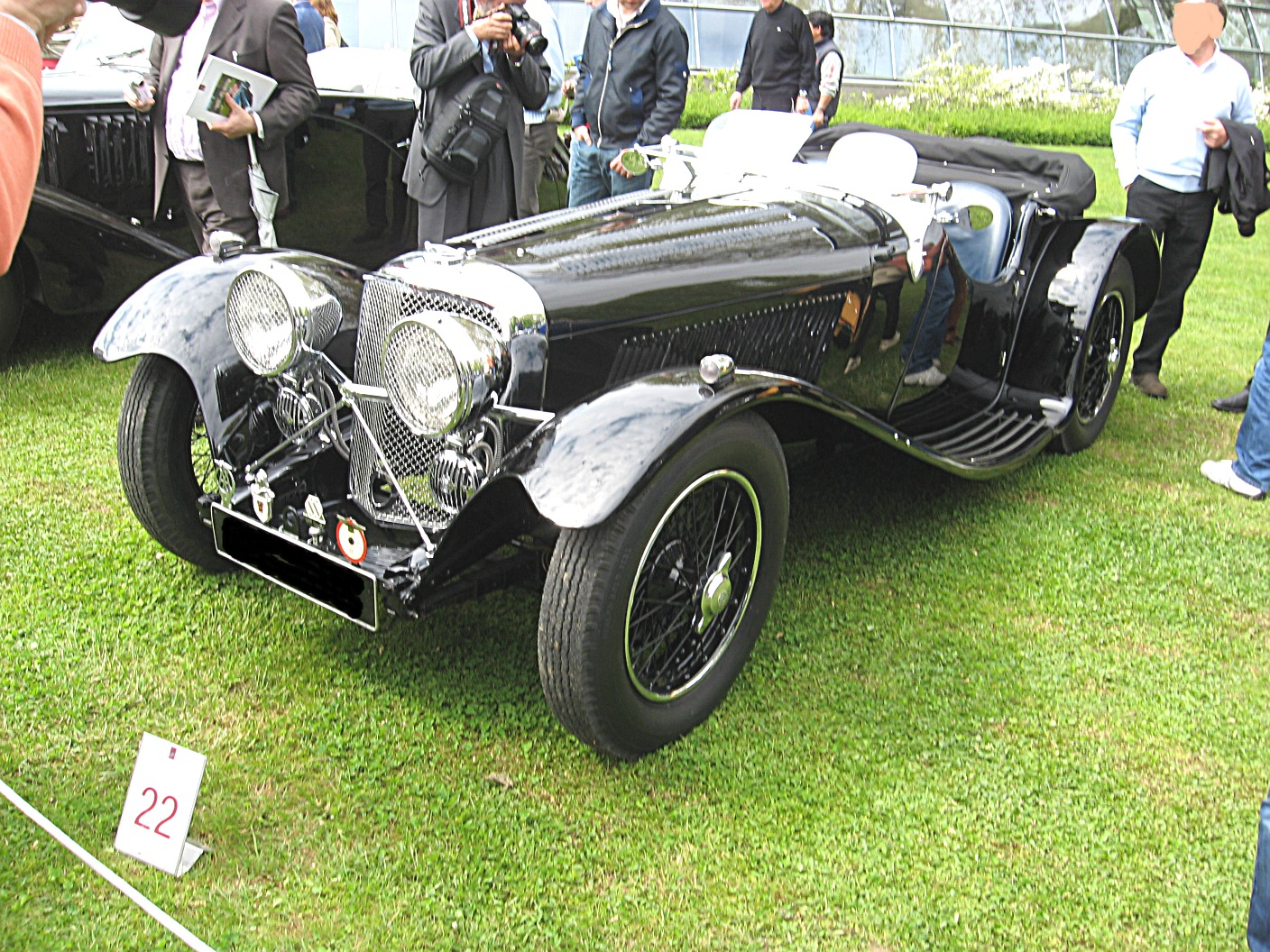
SS 90 at Concorso d'Eleganza Villa d'Este in 2008

The first of the open two-seater sports cars came in March 1935 with the SS 90, so called because of its claimed 90 mph (140 km/h) top speed. This car used the 2½-litre side-valve, six-cylinder engine in a short-chassis "cut and shut" SS 1 brought down to an SS 2's wheelbase. Only 23 were made.

Harry Weslake was set to work on engine development. Bill Heynes came to be chief engineer from Hillman — before that Humber. Weslake's new cylinder head was manufactured for SS by Standard.

The Weslake head and twin RAG carburettors were fitted to the last year's production of SS 1 and SS 2 cars.

== Famous name ==
=== Four-door sports saloons and drophead coupés ===
To counteract the "more show than go" criticism of their SS90, Lyons had engaged William Heynes as chief engineer and Harry Weslake for engine tuning. Weslake was asked to redesign the 2½-litre 70 bhp side-valve engine to achieve 90 bhp. His answer was an overhead-valve design that produced 102 bhp and it was this engine that launched the new SS Jaguar sports and saloon cars in 1936.

The SS Jaguar 2½-litre saloon with its 102 bhp six-cylinder Weslake-designed cross-flow ohv cylinder head on its Standard engine caused a sensation when it was launched at a trade luncheon for dealers and press at London's Mayfair Hotel on 21 September 1935. The show car was in fact a prototype. Luncheon guests were asked to write down the UK price for which they thought the car would be sold and the average of their answers was £765. Even in that deflationary period, the actual price at just £395 would have been a pleasant surprise for many customers. Also available was a similar looking but scaled-down version using a 1½-litre four-cylinder side-valve engine.

The Motor magazine in its announcement issue of 24 September 1935 referred to the SS Jaguar's distinguished appearance, outstanding performance and attractive price. With its new 2½-litre engine it could now compete with Cecil Kimber's heavily influenced by Morris but brand new MG SA.

In a speech of Lyons as the chairman and managing director to the shareholders on 11 October 1935, he said: "This new car, which is called the Jaguar and has received a most enthusiastic reception from the whole of the trade and public has been produced to an ideal. It has fulfilled all our most optimistic anticipations, for it was intended to produce a car of extremely high quality and performance, hitherto associated with only the most exclusive type of car, at a moderate price."

Everyone else noted the new grille's likeness to a Bentley's.

== Steel ==
In 1938 saloon and drophead production moved from coachbuilt (wood framed) to all steel and a 3½-litre engine was added to the range. The 2½-litre and 3½-litre cars shared the same chassis and body design although it was necessary to use a wider radiator for the 3½-litre. The new 1½-litre for 1938 used the same body shell as the six-cylinder cars but on a shorter chassis and its new larger 1776 cc engine had overhead valves.

=== SS 100 ===
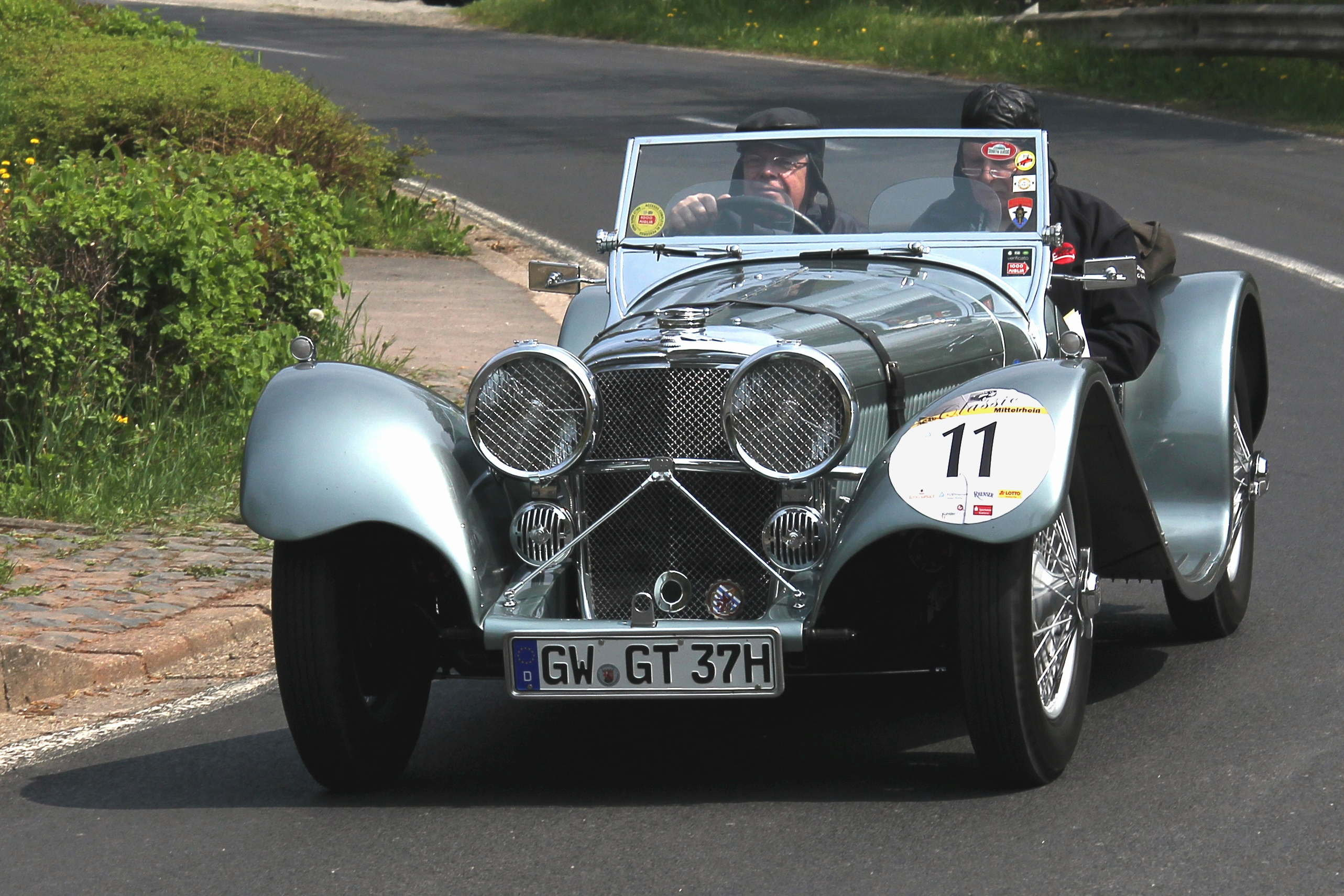
SS Jaguar 100 1938

The new open two-seater sports car carried the title: SS Jaguar 100. Only 198 of the 2½-litre and 116 of the 3½-litre models were made and with a 100 mph (160 km/h) top speed and 0-60 mph time of 11 seconds. Surviving vehicles are relatively uncommon and are infrequently offered for sale.

== Models ==
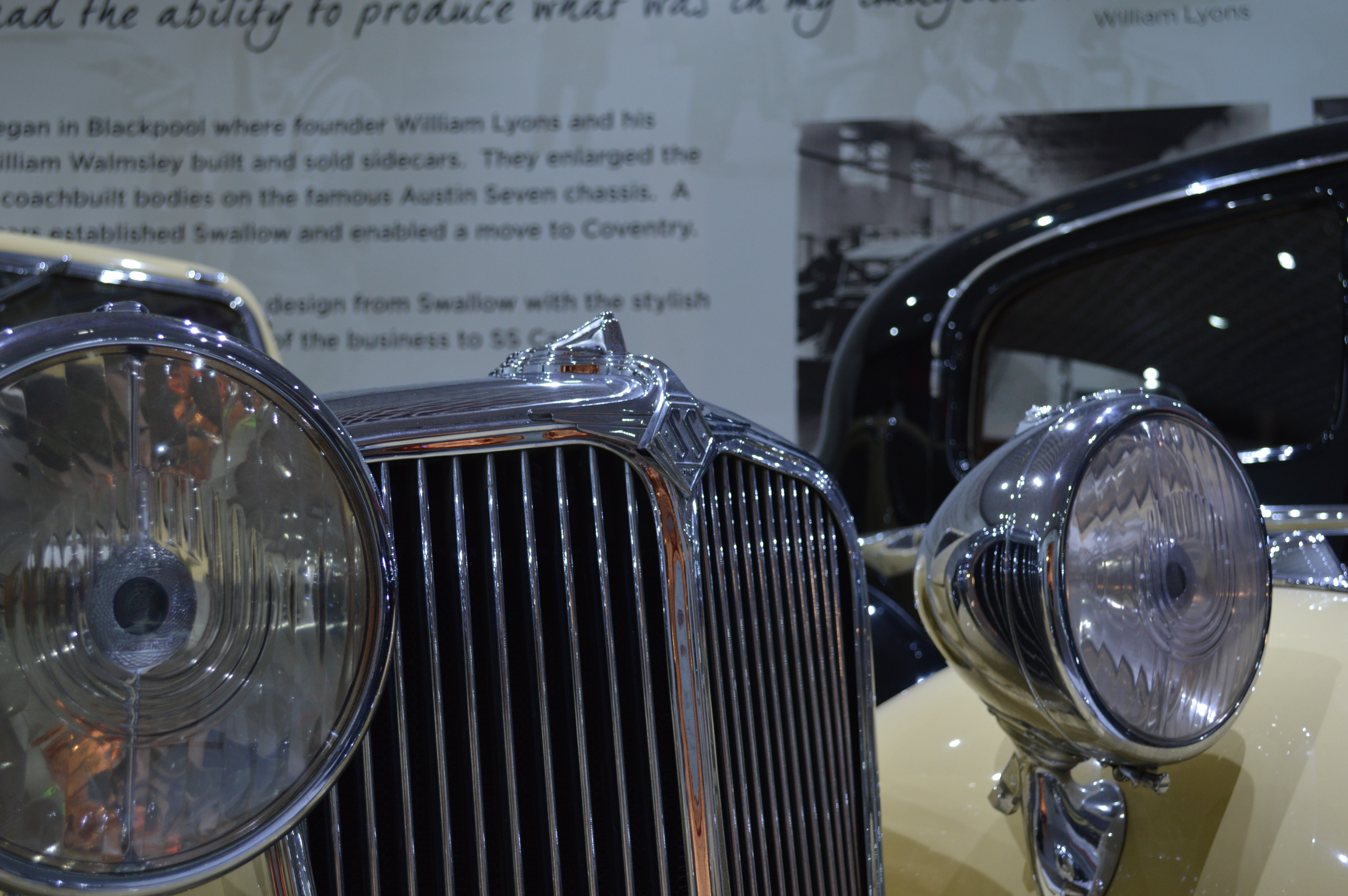
Display of Coventry Transport Museum

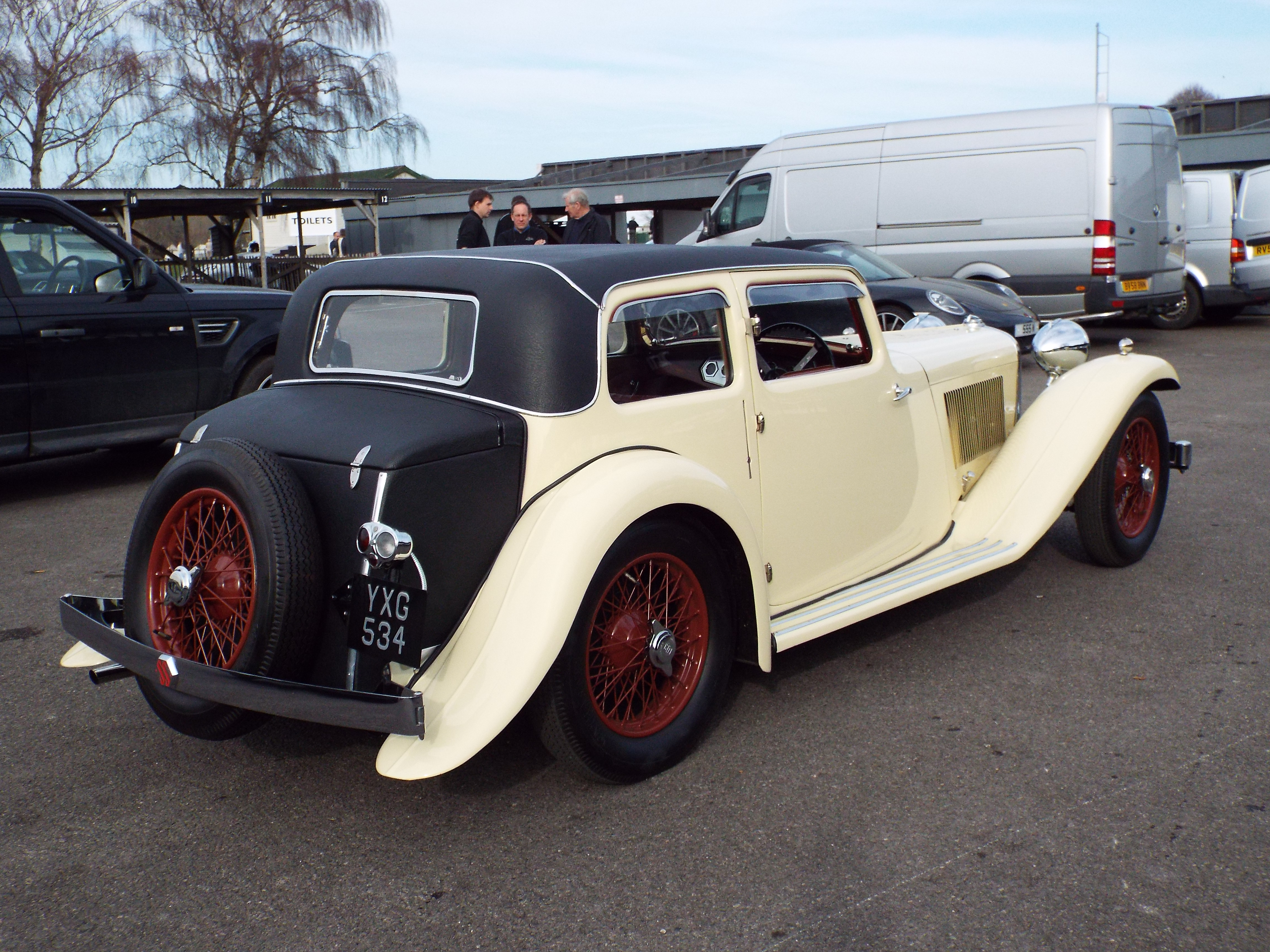
SS 1 Sixteen fixed head coupé 1934

- 1932–36 SS 1 6-cylinder; Sixteen 2054 cc or Twenty 2552 cc

- new bodies introduced:
- 1932 fixed head coupé
- 1933 4-seater tourer
- 1933 4-seater saloon
- 1935 Airline saloon
- 1935 4-seater drophead coupé

- 1932–36 SS 2 4-cylinder; 1006 cc; then from 1934 either 1343 cc or 1608 cc

- new bodies introduced:
- 1932 fixed head coupé
- 1933 4-seater tourer
- 1933 4-seater saloon

From October 1935 SS Jaguar

Open cars:

- 1935-37 SS Jaguar 90 6-cylinder; Twenty 2663 cc

- new bodies introduced:
- 1935 open two-seater
- 1936 4-seater tourer (SS Jaguar open tourer)

- 1936–40 SS Jaguar 100 6-cylinder; 2663 cc or 3485 cc

- new bodies introduced:
- 1936 open two-seater

Four-door sports saloons and two-door drophead coupés

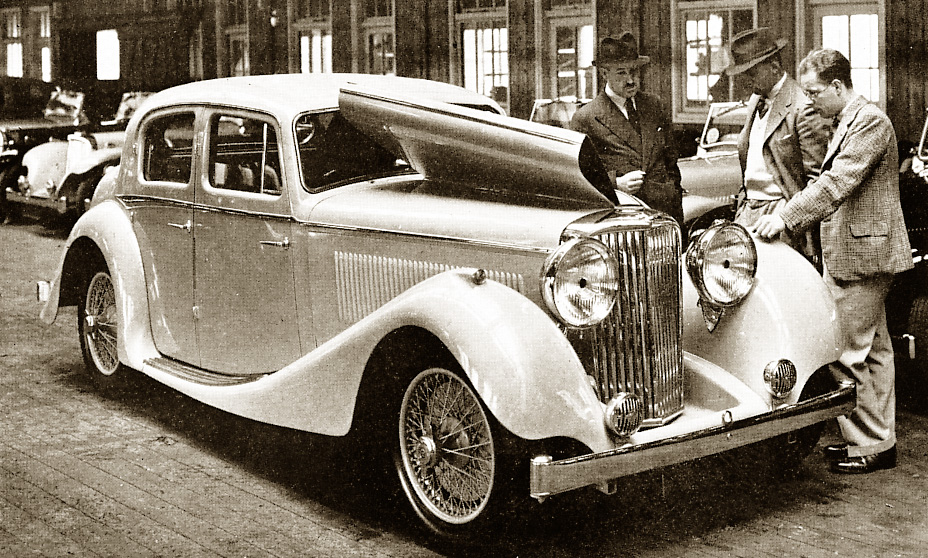
Delivery of a 2½-litre car

- 1935–40 SS Jaguar 1½-litre 4-cylinder
- 1935–40 SS Jaguar 2½-litre 6-cylinder
- 1938–40 SS Jaguar 3½-litre 6-cylinder

for information only — postwar and not SS
1946–49 Jaguar 1½-litre 4-cylinder
1946–48 Jaguar 2½-litre 6-cylinder
1946–48 Jaguar 3½-litre 6-cylinder

Car production stopped in 1940.

== Jaguar Cars ==
On 23 March 1945 the shareholders in general meeting agreed to change the company's name to Jaguar Cars Limited. Said Chairman William Lyons: "Unlike S.S. the name Jaguar is distinctive and cannot be connected or confused with any similar foreign name."

When production restarted the saloons were simply named Jaguar 1½-litre, 2½-litre or 3½-litre. The model that followed these cars was called the Jaguar Mark V and so the immediate post war trio have become known unofficially as the Mark IV Jaguars. S.S. Cars Limited, company number 00333482 which is current — but dormant — in 2014, was incorporated 9 November 1937 with the name Jaguar Cars Limited. Most likely this is a result of steps taken to protect famous names.

== Swallow Coachbuilding Co. (1935) Limited ==
This company, a wholly owned subsidiary of S. S., was formed for the production of Swallow sidecars and began operating on 1 May 1935. In January 1946 the Helliwell Group, an aircraft maintenance firm, bought Swallow Coachbuilding Company (1935) Limited from Jaguar Cars Limited. Sidecars produced at Helliwells' Walsall Airport works were built in the same way as the originals and used the same patented trademark. They closed their workshop in the late 1950s.

== See also ==
- List of car manufacturers of the United Kingdom
