= William Walmsley =

British automobile designer

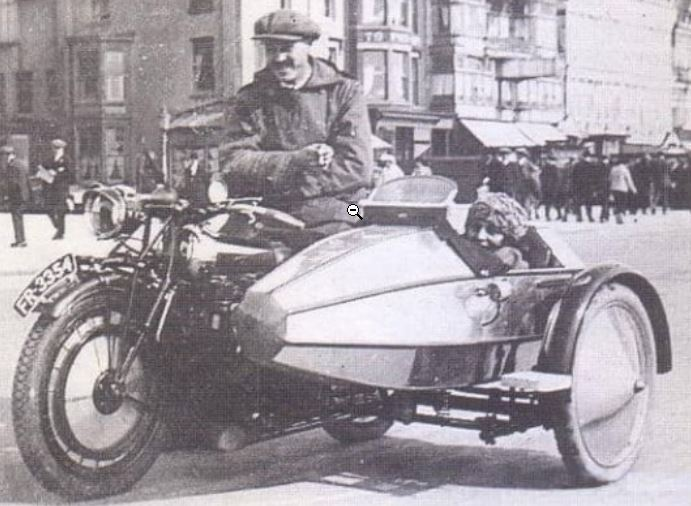
- Walmsley and wife in Blackpool, about 1923
- Born: 1892; Stockport, England, UK
- Died: June 1961 (aged 68–69); Poulton-le-Fylde, England, UK
- Occupation: British automobile designer
- Known for: Co-founder of Swallow Sidecar, later to become Jaguar Cars

William Walmsley (1892– June 1961) was with William Lyons a co-founder of the Swallow Sidecar Company, which later became the Jaguar car company.

He was born in Stockport, England, the son of a coal merchant. He served in the Cheshire Yeomanry Regiment during the 1914–18 War, receiving an injury to his leg. When his father retired in 1921, the family moved to Blackpool. Walmsley then lived in King Edward Avenue, close to William Lyons. Walmsley was good with his hands and had learned basic principles of coachbuilding as part of the family coal transporting business. He designed a motorcycle sidecar on a Watsonian chassis which he attached to an ex-War Department Triumph. It had a bullet-shaped streamlined octagonal body, quite unusual for the day. Only Harley-Davidson in the USA had anything similar. He called it the "Ot-as-Ell", and soon found that other motorcycle enthusiasts wanted one. He began refurbishing ex-WD bikes and building sidecars in his garden shed at the rate of perhaps one a week, the trimming being done by his wife. He registered the design officially in April 1921 and advertised it at £28. The polished aluminum sidecar attracted his 20-year-old neighbor Lyons, who bought one. The following year, the two men decided to begin producing the sidecar commercially. The Swallow Sidecar Company of Blackpool was the result, the partnership officially beginning a week after Lyons' 21st birthday for legal reasons.

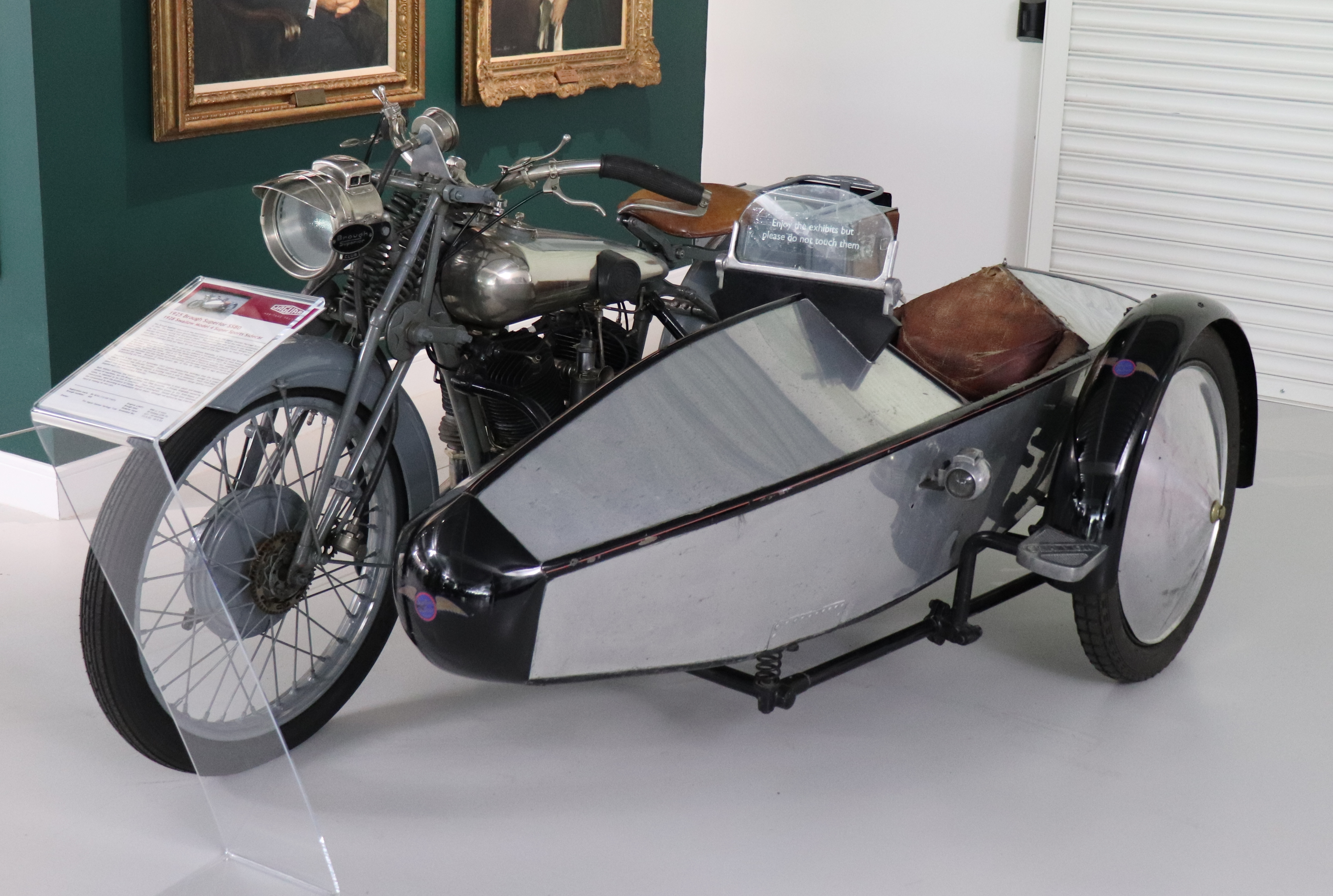
1925 Brough Superior SS80 & 1928 Swallow Model 4 Sidecar

The octagonal Model 1 was very popular, and soon Walmsley and Lyons were riding Brough Superiors with their sidecars to the November 1922 Motorcycle Show in London. Within two years it was joined by other models including a long-tailed pentagonal Model 4 and a lozenge shaped Model 6 called the "Scrapper".

The first Swallow bodied car was quite unofficial, Walmsley having obtained the burnt-out remains of an Austro-Daimler car and brought it to the factory to be rebodied by his employees, though he paid them for this work.

In 1927, the company started coach-building for motorcars, putting their own sporting bodywork on an Austin Seven chassis, and became known as the Swallow Sidecar and Coachbuilding Company. They built many Austin Swallows, and also bodied Wolseley, Morris, Swift, Alvis and Fiat chassis. In late 1928 the company moved to Holbrook, Coventry. By 1929, they had contracted to buy engines and chassis from Standard Motor Company, and with Swallow's body they were sold as the Standard Swallow, exhibiting on a stand at the Olympia Show.

Sales were good, and at the 1931 London Motor Show their SS-I coupe sports car on a specially designed Standard chassis was exhibited. It had the look of a £1000 car but cost just £310 (£21,000 in today pounds).

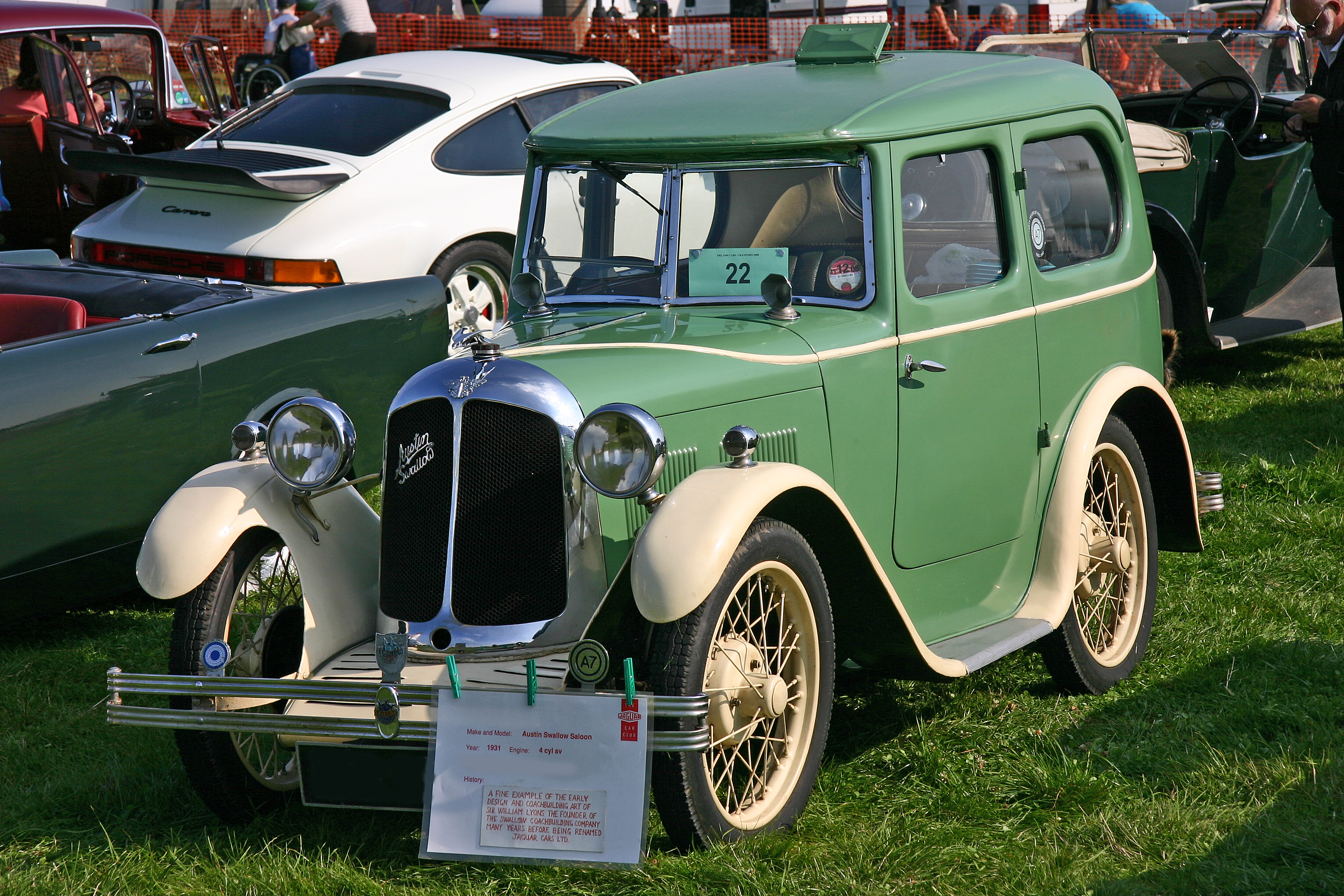
1931 Austin Seven Swallow at a car show

A smaller model called the SS-II joined it at £210, and the company was renamed SS Cars, Ltd. The SS-I and SS-II were produced with open top and enclosed four seat versions, and Swallow bodywork on other chassis was discontinued, but sidecar production continued into the 1940s.

Walmsley had a personal 1934 SS.1 two seater commissioned.

Walmsley was content with the company's modest success and saw little point in taking risks by expanding the firm. He spent more and more time and company resources making parts for his model railway. Lyons bought him out with a public stock offering and became the sole managing director in 1935. Walmsley walked away with his money and invested it and his design talents in a new business making trailers and caravans, first the Airlite Trailer Company, then Coventry Steel Caravans. One of the Airlites was extremely streamlined. He pulled these at first with a Bentley, later a Studebaker, and finally a Jaguar.

The name "Jaguar" appeared as "SS Jaguar" in 1935 after Walmsley had left the company and later after World War II in 1945 the company was renamed as Jaguar Cars to avoid unfavourable connotations of the initials of the infamous SS organisation of the Nazi Party.

Walmsley married Emily Letitia Jeffries in 1921, with whom he had one son, Bobby. Their house was called Swallowdene. Walmsley built a push car for his little son that was shaped like his sidecars. Bobby was killed in a Hawker Typhoon when he crashed into the cliffs at Dieppe. Emily divorced him, and he later married Winnifred, who survived him when he died 4 or 5 June 1961.
