= Jaguar Mark IV =

SS Jaguar Jaguar 1½—2½—3½ Litre
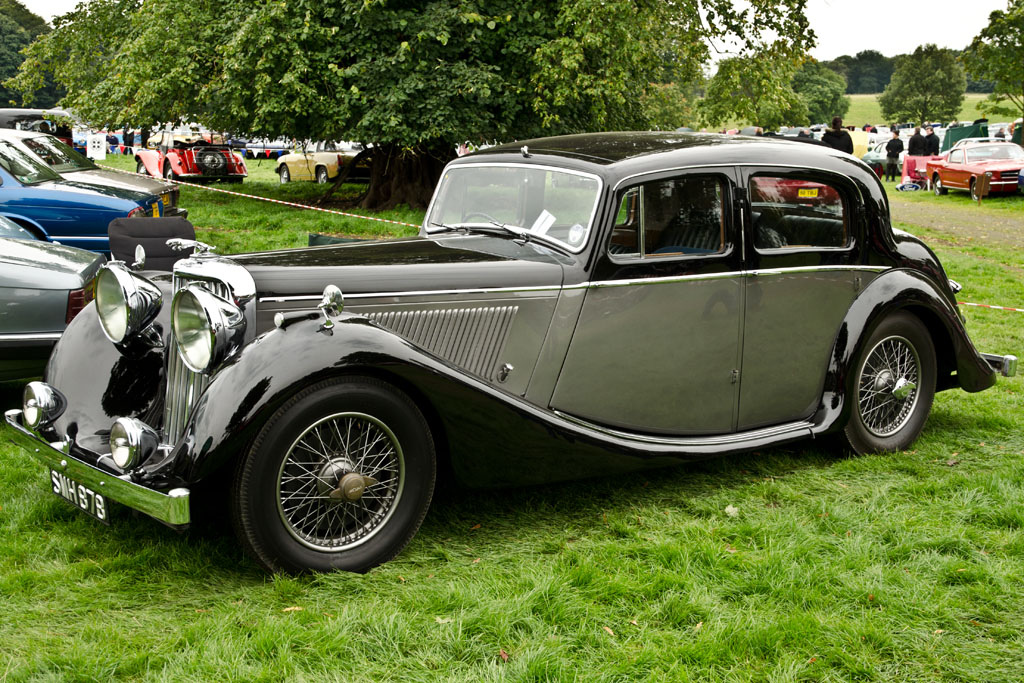
- Jaguar 2½ litre sports saloon 1947

Overview
- Manufacturer: SS Cars (1936–1940); Jaguar Cars (1945–1949)
- Production: 1936–1949
- Assembly: United Kingdom: Coventry, England

Body and chassis
- Class: Executive car (E)
- Layout: FR layout

Chronology
- Predecessor: SS Cars Ltd SS1
- Successor: Jaguar Mark V

The Jaguar Mark IV (pronounced mark four) is a range of automobiles built by Jaguar Cars from 1945 to 1949. The cars were marketed as the Jaguar 1½ litre, Jaguar 2½ litre and Jaguar 3½ litre with the Mark IV name later applied retrospectively to distinguish this model from the succeeding Mark V range.

The range was a return to production of the SS Jaguar 1½ litre, 2½ litre and 3½ litre models produced by SS Cars from 1936 to 1940. Before World War II the model name Jaguar was given to all cars in the range built by SS Cars Ltd with the saloons titled SS Jaguar 1½ litre, 2½ litre or 3½ litre and the two-seater sports cars the SS Jaguar 100 2½ litre or 3½ litre. In March 1945 the company name SS Cars Ltd was changed to Jaguar Cars Ltd.

All the Mark IVs were built on a separate chassis frame with suspension by semi-elliptic leaf springs on rigid axles front and rear.

== SS Jaguar and Jaguar 1½ Litre ==
SS Jaguar 1½ Litre Jaguar 1½ Litre
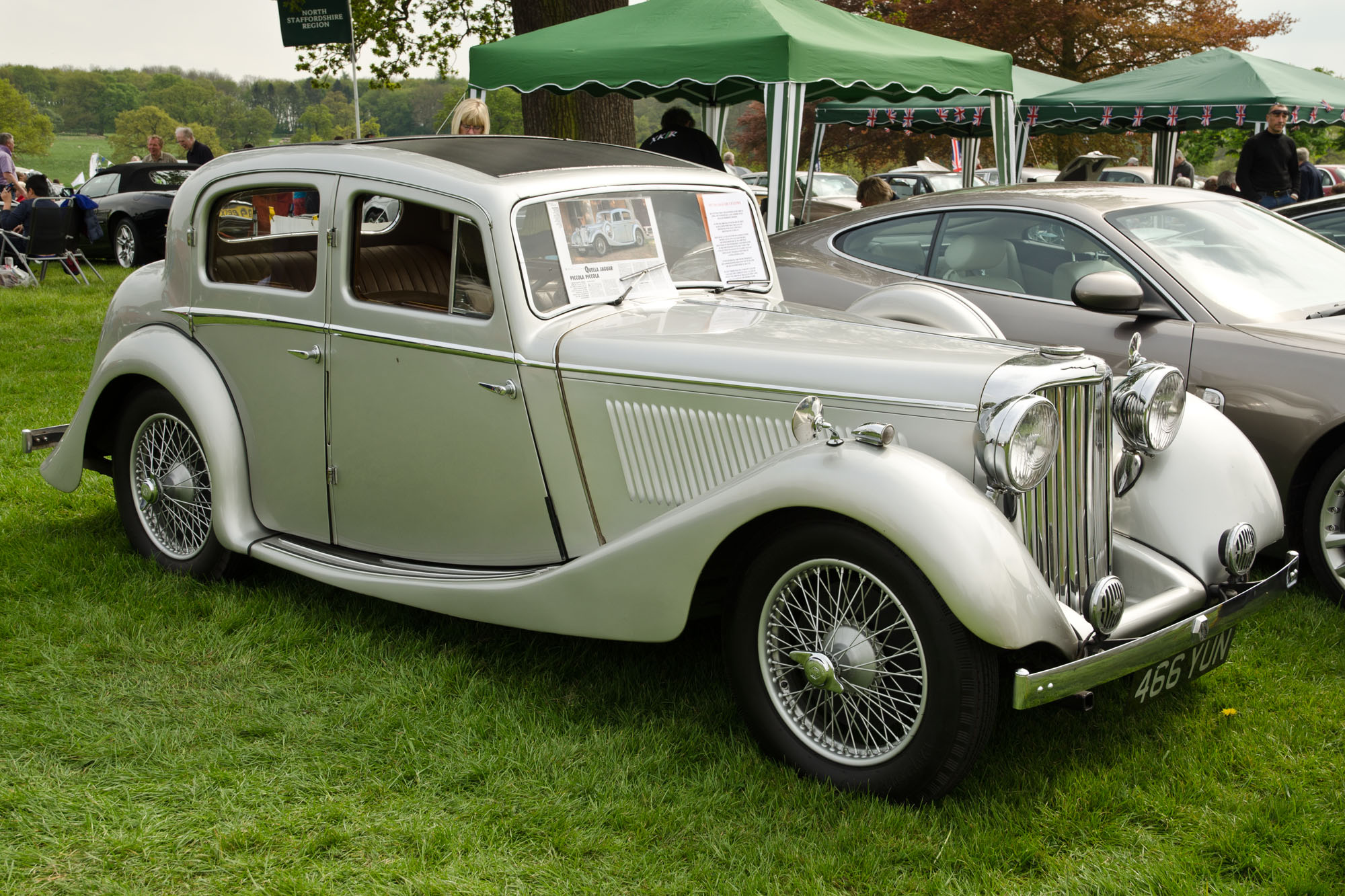
- SS Jaguar sports saloon 1937

Overview
- Production: 1936–1949; 10,980 made

Body and chassis
- Body style: 4-door saloon 2-door drophead coupé (1938–1948)

Powertrain
- Engine: 1,608 cc (1.6 L) I4; 1,776 cc (1.8 L) I4; Standard
- Transmission: 4-speed manual

Dimensions
- Wheelbase: 112.5 in (2,860 mm)
- Length: 173 in (4,390 mm)
- Width: 65.5 in (1,660 mm)
- Height: 60 in (1,520 mm)

The smallest model of the range originally featured a 1608 cc side valve Standard engine but from 1938 this was replaced by a 1776 cc overhead-valve unit still from Standard who also supplied the four-speed manual transmission.

Pre-war the car was available as a saloon or drophead coupé but post war only the closed model was made. Up to 1938 body construction on all the models was by the traditional steel on wood method but in that year it changed to all steel. Performance was not a strong point but 70 mph (113 km/h) was possible: the car featured the same cabin dimensions and well-appointed interior as its longer-engined brothers.

Despite its lack of out-and-out performance, a report of the time, comparing the 4-cylinder 1½-litre with its 6-cylinder siblings, opined that the smallest-engined version of the car was "as is often the case ... the sweetest running car" with a "big car cruising gait in the sixties".

Mechanically operated brakes using a Girling system were fitted.

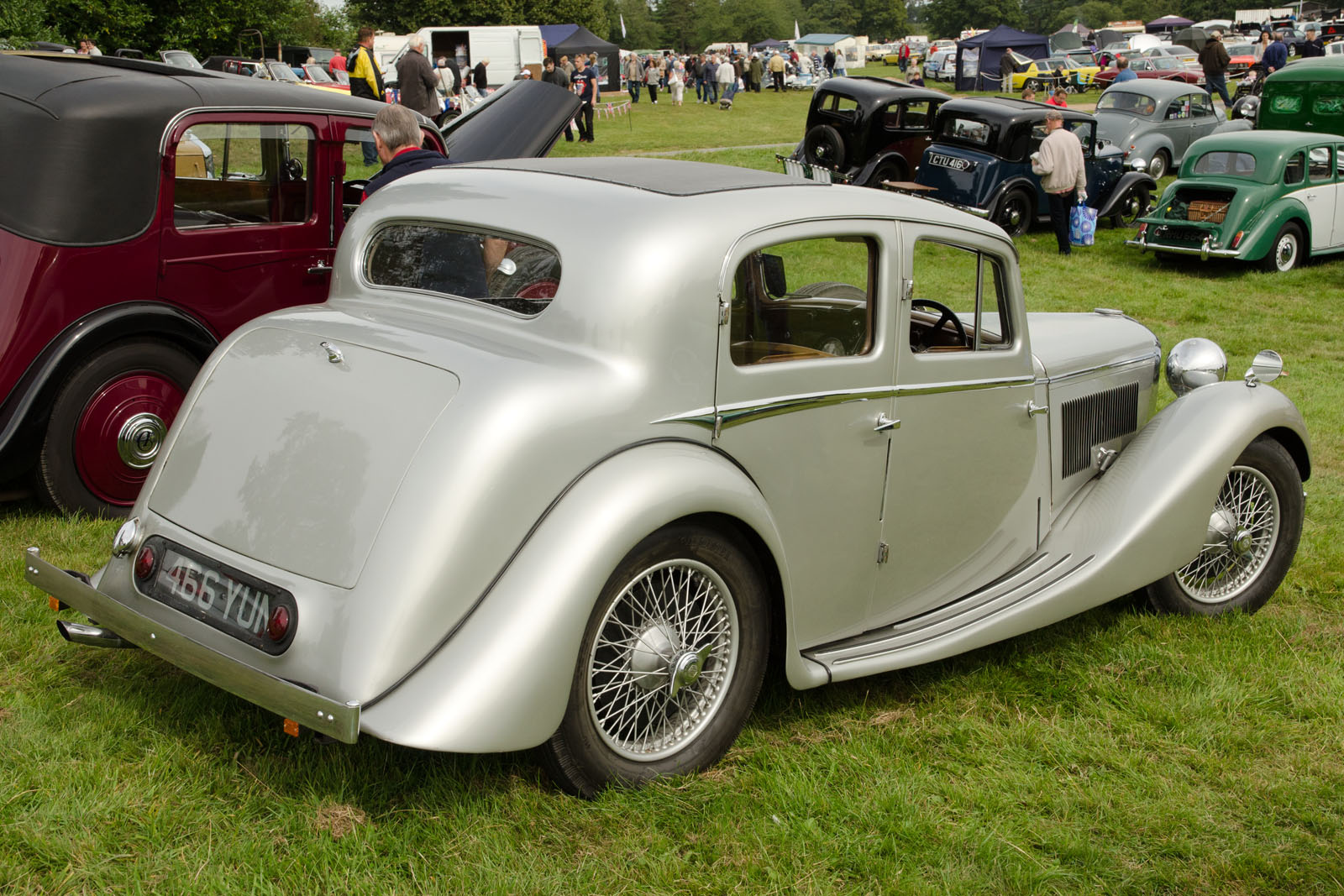
SS Jaguar sports saloon 1937

== SS Jaguar and Jaguar 2½ Litre ==
SS Jaguar 2½ Litre Jaguar 2½ Litre
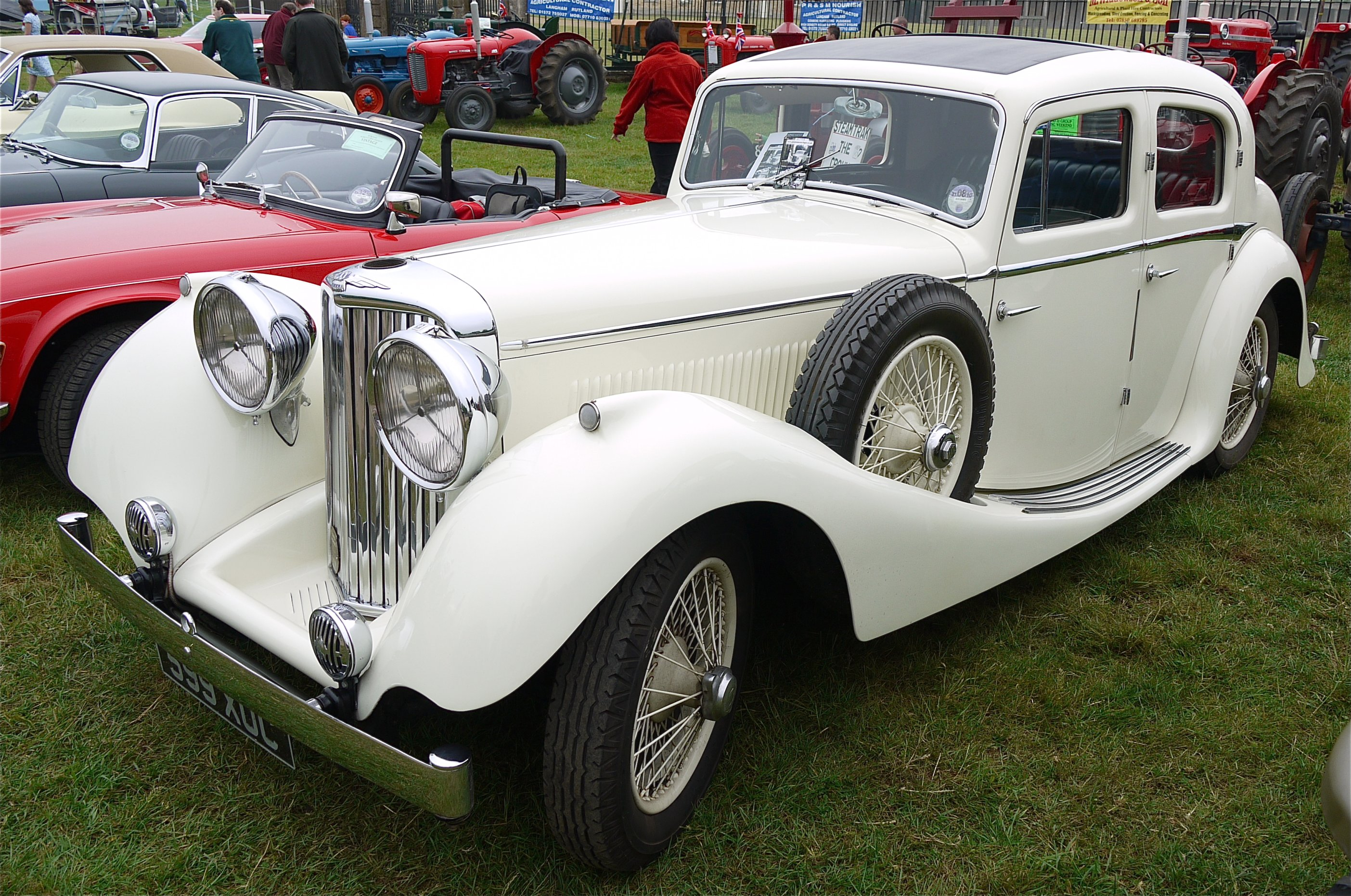
- SS Jaguar sports saloon 1936

Overview
- Production: 1936–1948; 6281 made

Body and chassis
- Body style: 4-door saloon 2-door drophead coupé (1938–1948); 2-door tourer (1936–1937)

Powertrain
- Engine: 2,664 cc (2.7 L) I6

Dimensions
- Wheelbase: 1935–1937: 119 in (3,020 mm); 1938–1948: 120 in (3,050 mm)
- Length: 186 in (4,720 mm)
- Width: 66 in (1,680 mm)

Again the engine was sourced from Standard but was redesigned to use overhead valves rather than the side-valve layout used by Standard. Harry Weslake was called in to advise on the cylinder head design, and the change resulted in a very considerable uplift in power to give 105 bhp. Unlike the 1½ Litre there were some drophead models made post-war.

The chassis was originally 119 in (3,020 mm) but grew by an inch (25 mm) in 1938 to 120 in (3,050 mm). The extra length over the 1½ Litre was used for the six-cylinder engine and the passenger accommodation was the same size.

== SS Jaguar and Jaguar 3½ Litre ==
SS Jaguar 3½ Litre Jaguar 3½ Litre
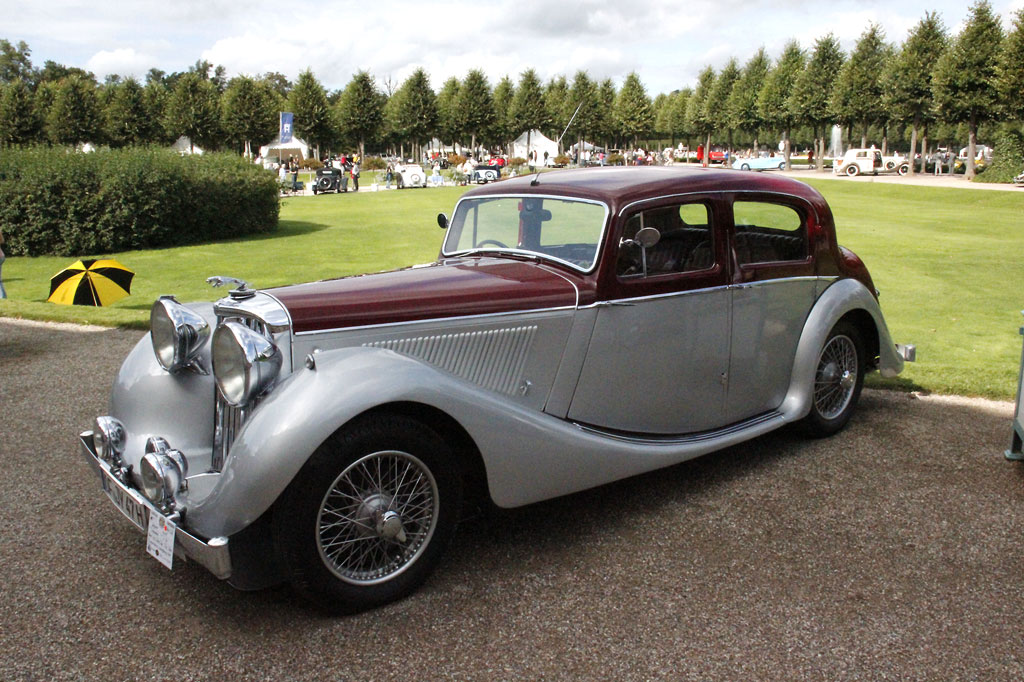
- Jaguar sports saloon 1947

Overview
- Production: 1938–1948; 3162 made

Body and chassis
- Body style: 4-door saloon 2-door drophead coupé

Powertrain
- Engine: 3,485 cc (3.5 L) I6

Dimensions
- Wheelbase: 120 in (3,050 mm)
- Length: 186 in (4,720 mm)
- Width: 66 in (1,680 mm)

The 3½ Litre, introduced in 1938, was essentially the same body and chassis as the 2½ Litre but the larger 125 bhp engine gave better performance but at the expense of economy. The rear axle ratio was 4.25:1 as opposed to the 4.5:1 on the 2½ Litre.

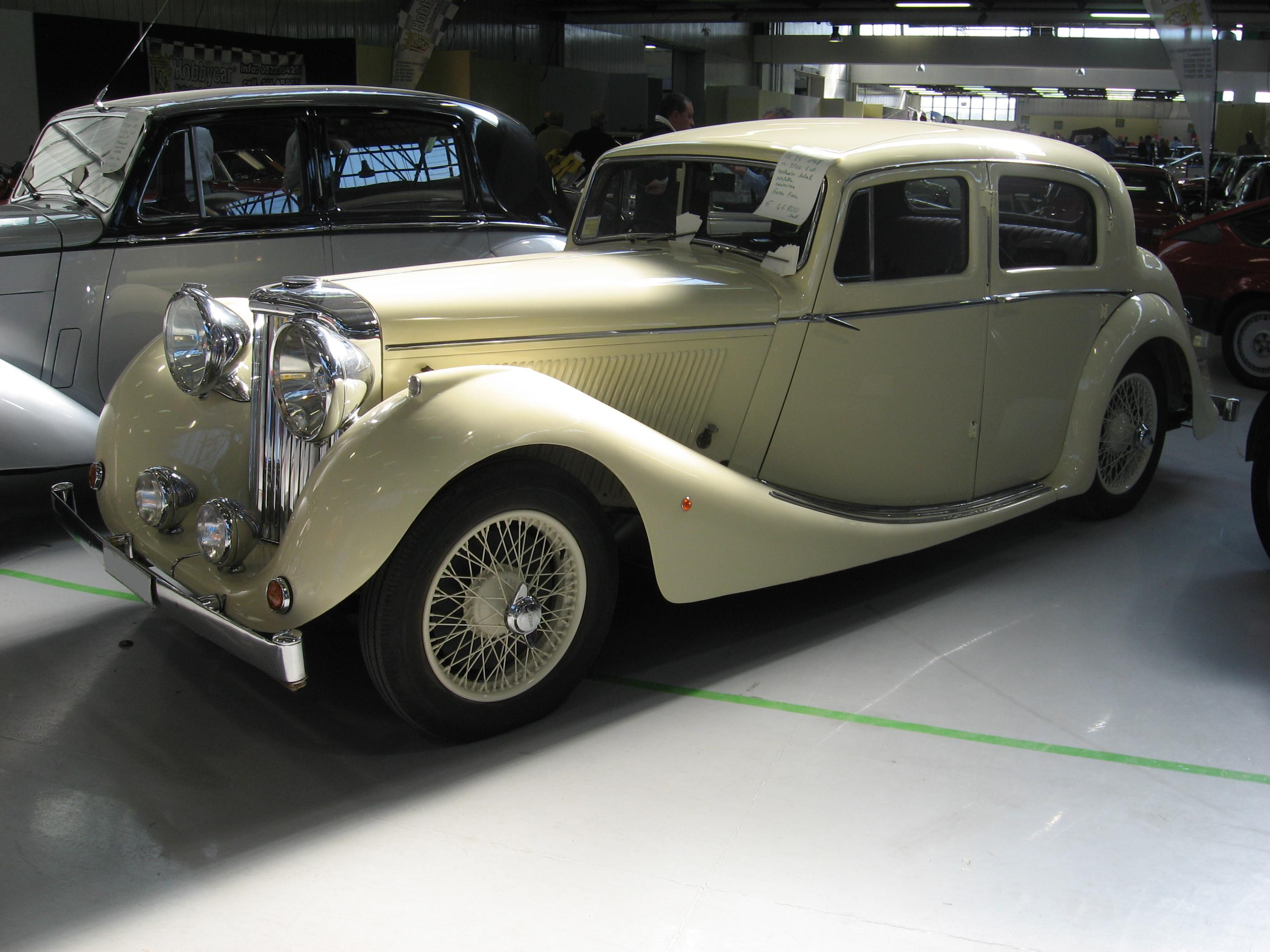
SS Jaguar
sports saloon

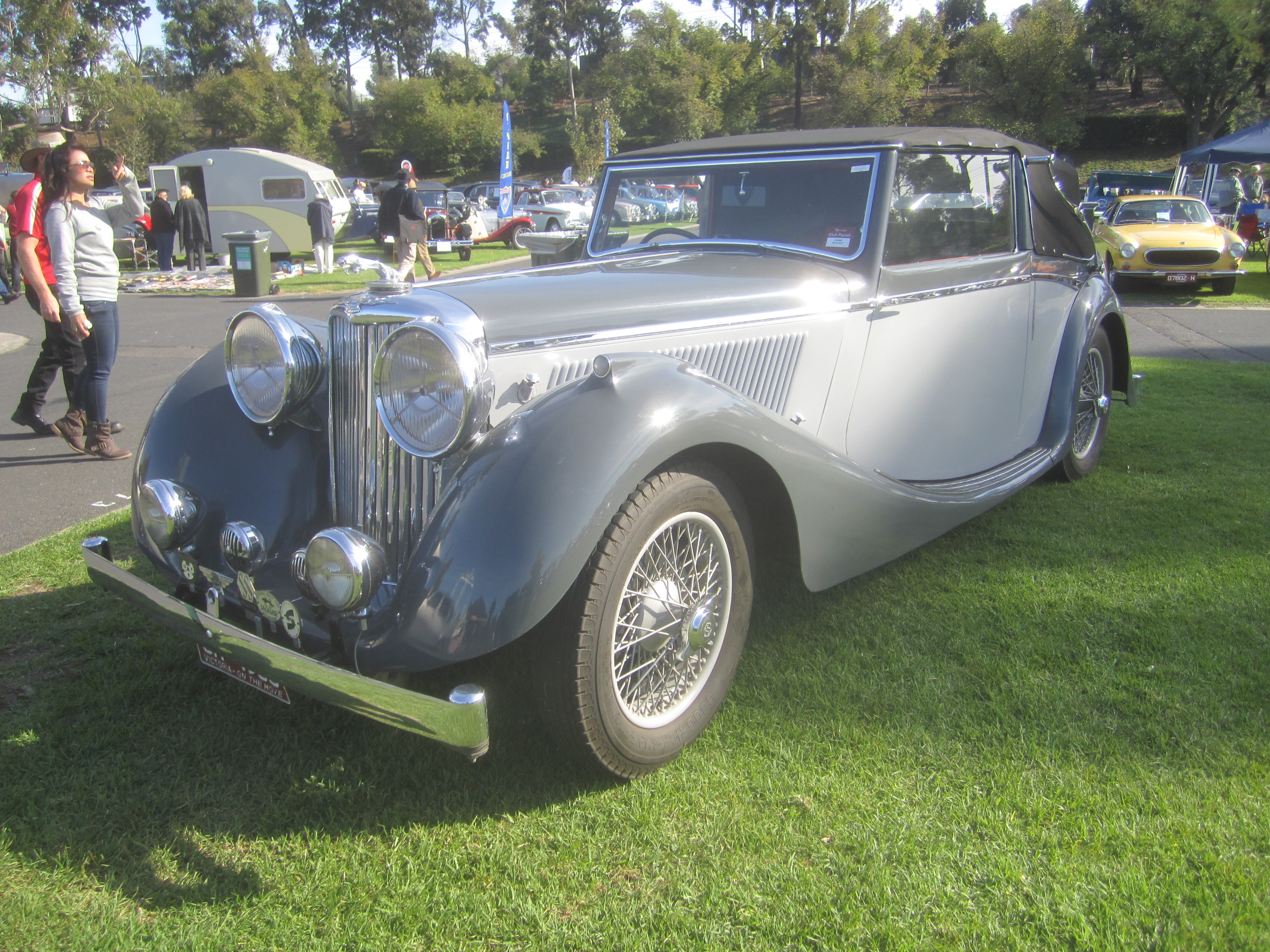
SS Jaguar
drophead coupé 1940
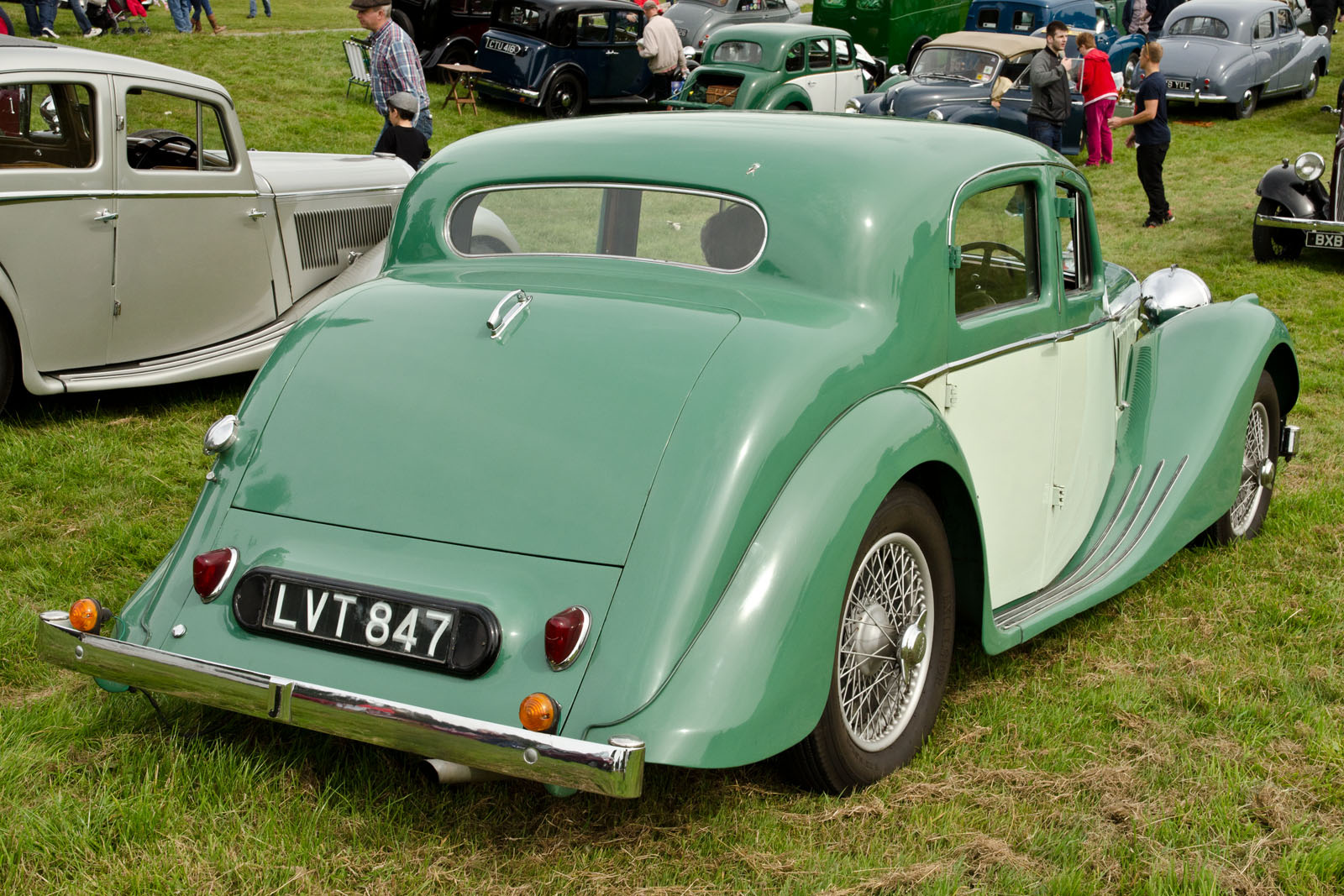
Jaguar
sports saloon 1948

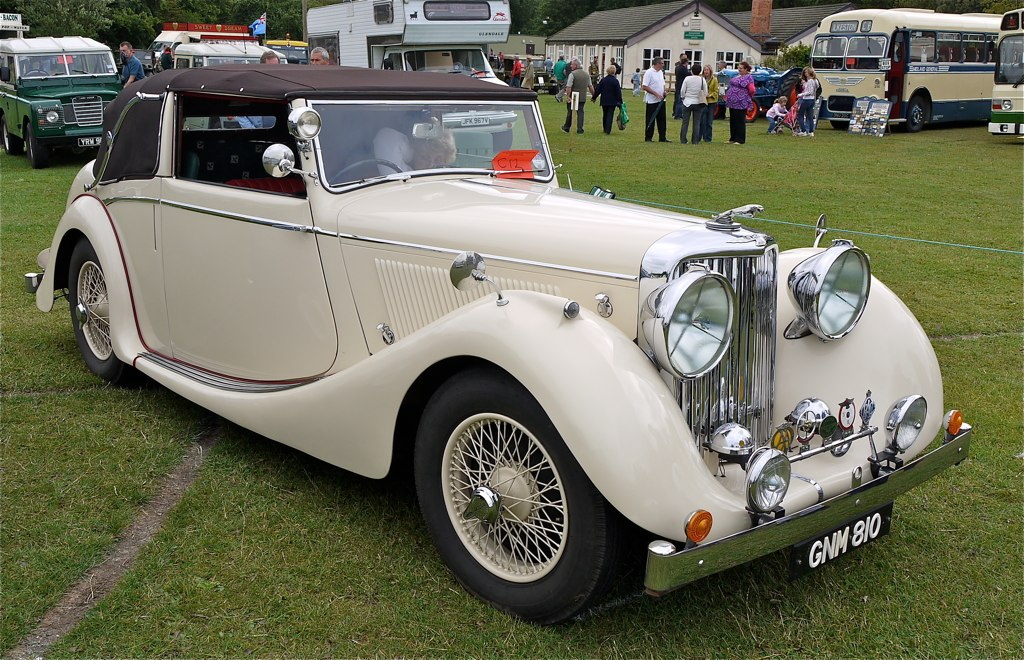
Jaguar
drophead coupé 1948
