= SS 1 =

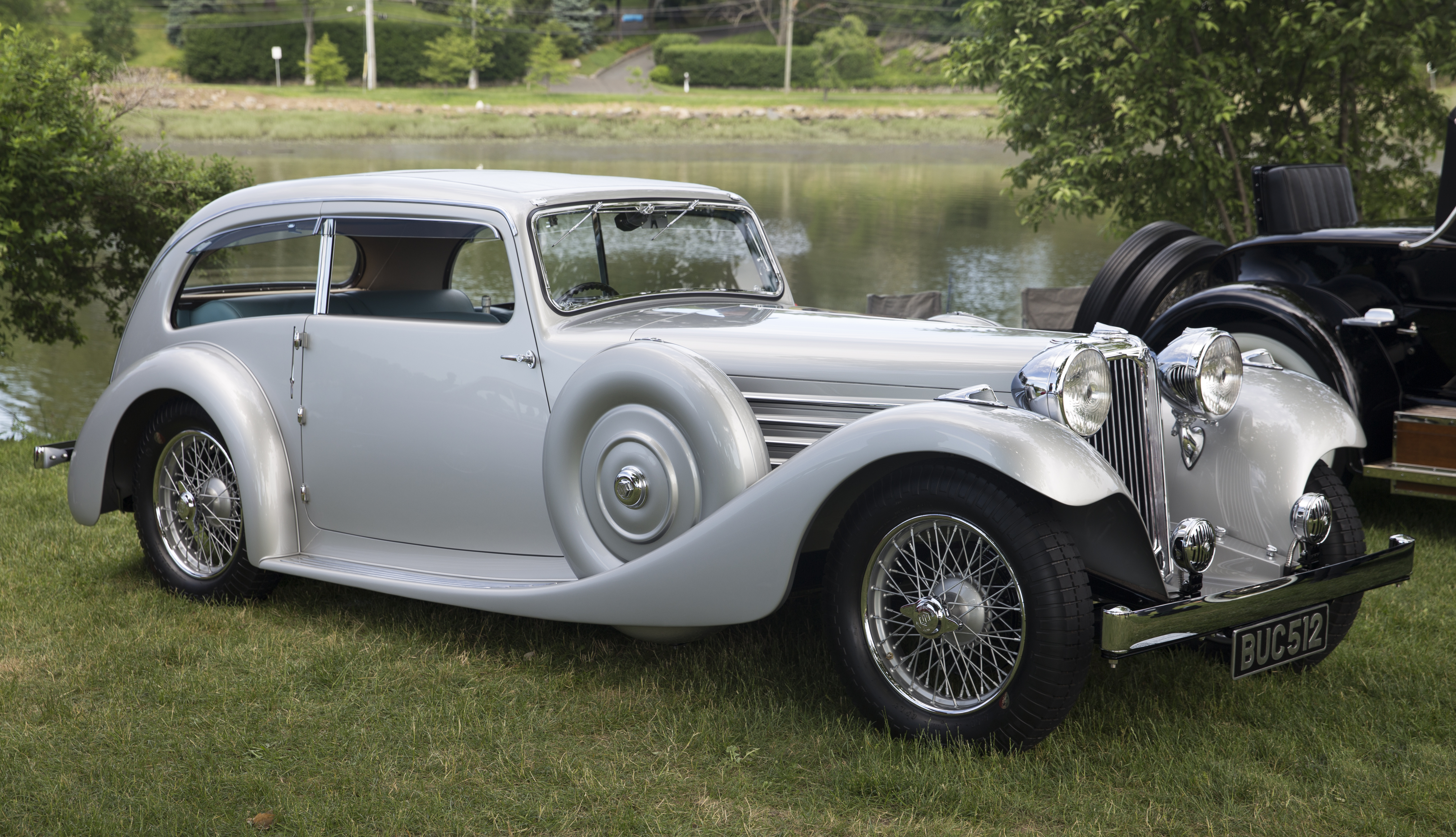
- 1935 Airline Saloon

Overview
- Manufacturer: Swallow Coachbuilding Company (1931–1934); SS Cars Limited (1934–1936)
- Production: 1931–1936
- Assembly: United Kingdom: Coventry

Body and chassis
- Class: Sports saloon
- Body style: In order of introduction — 2-door 4-seater: Fixed head coupé; Tourer; Sports saloon; Airline sports saloon; Drophead coupé
- Layout: Front engine rear wheel drive
- Related: Standard Flying Sixteen/Twenty

Chronology
- Predecessor: Swallow bodied Standard Fifteen
- Successor: 4/5-seater SS Jaguar 2½ litre

The SS 1 (the top of its radiator says 'SS One') is a British two-door sports saloon and tourer built by Swallow Coachbuilding Company in Foleshill, Coventry, England. It was first presented to the public at the 1931 London Motor Show. In slightly modified form, it went on to be manufactured between 1932 and 1936, during which time 148 cars were built.

== The Company ==
William Lyons and Co, as SS Cars Limited, purchased Swallow at the end of July 1934. In 1945 SS Cars changed its name to Jaguar Cars Limited.

== The Car ==
The SS 1 was noted for its apparent value for money and its attractive appearance, rather than its performance. From 1932 until 1934 it used either a 15HP six-cylinder side-valve Standard engine of 2,054 cc with 48 bhp (36 kW) or a 20HP, 2,552 cc 62 bhp (46 kW) version. The two engines were enlarged to 2,143 cc and 53 bhp (40 kW) or 2,663 cc and 68 bhp (51 kW) respectively for the 1934 to 1936 models. The chassis was also made by Standard and was changed to underslung suspension in 1933. With a top speed of 75 mph (121 km/h), the cars were remarkable for their styling and low cost rather than their performance. In 1932 the basic coupé cost £310. Just over 4,200 cars were made.

== Developments ==
The car was initially supplied as a four-seater fixed head coupé. In 1933 a tourer was launched. For 1934 the chassis was modified to give a wider track and better front footwells. The gearbox also gained synchromesh. In 1934 a saloon version and in 1935 an Airline coupé and drophead coupé were added to the range.

== Specifications ==
The car was 15 feet 6 inches (4,720 mm) long and 5 feet 3 1/2 inches (1,613 mm) wide and typically weighed around 2,300 lb (1,040 kg). The width increased to 5 feet 5 1/2 inches (1,664 mm) in 1934.

== Pictures ==
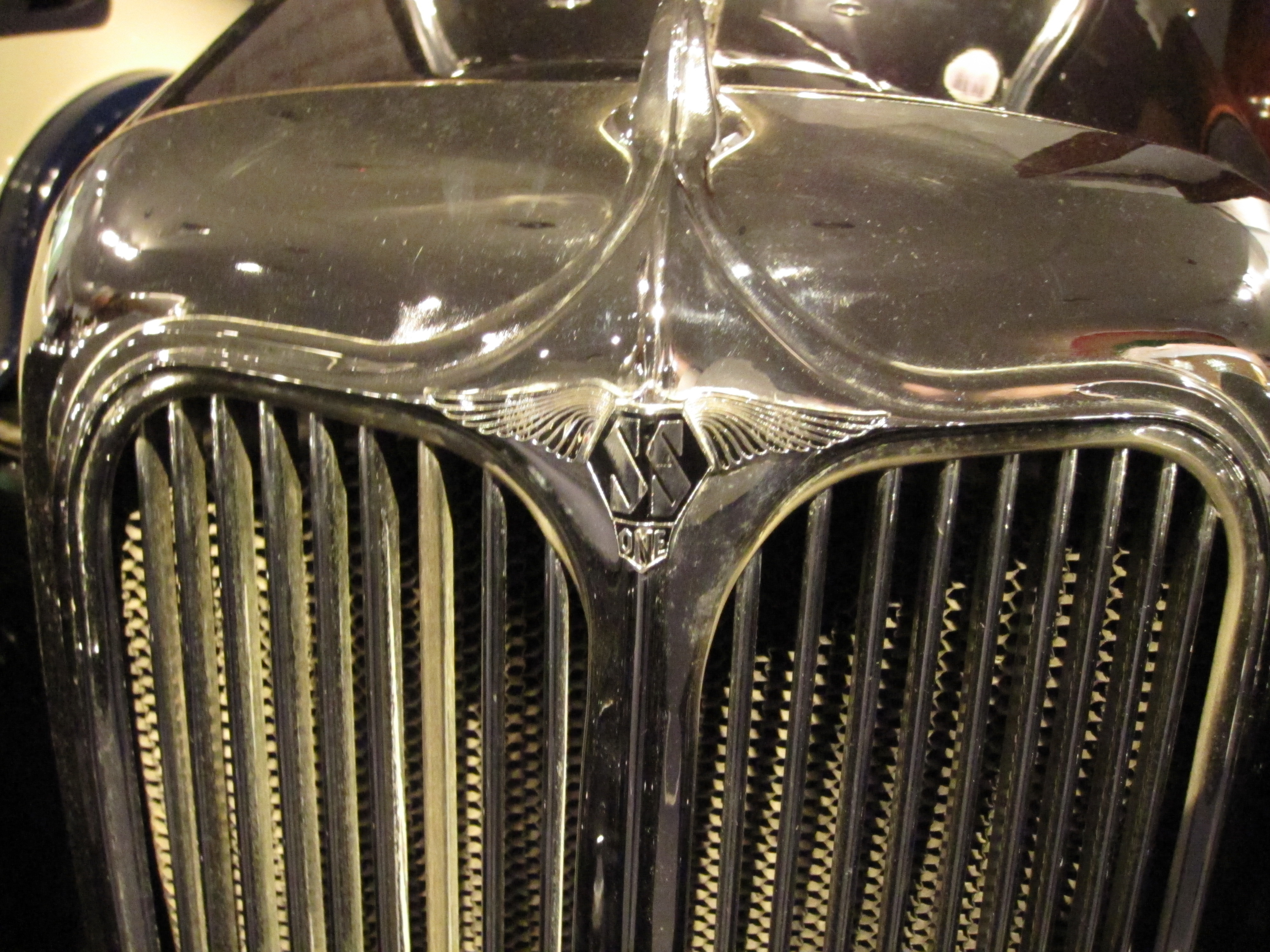
Radiator badge

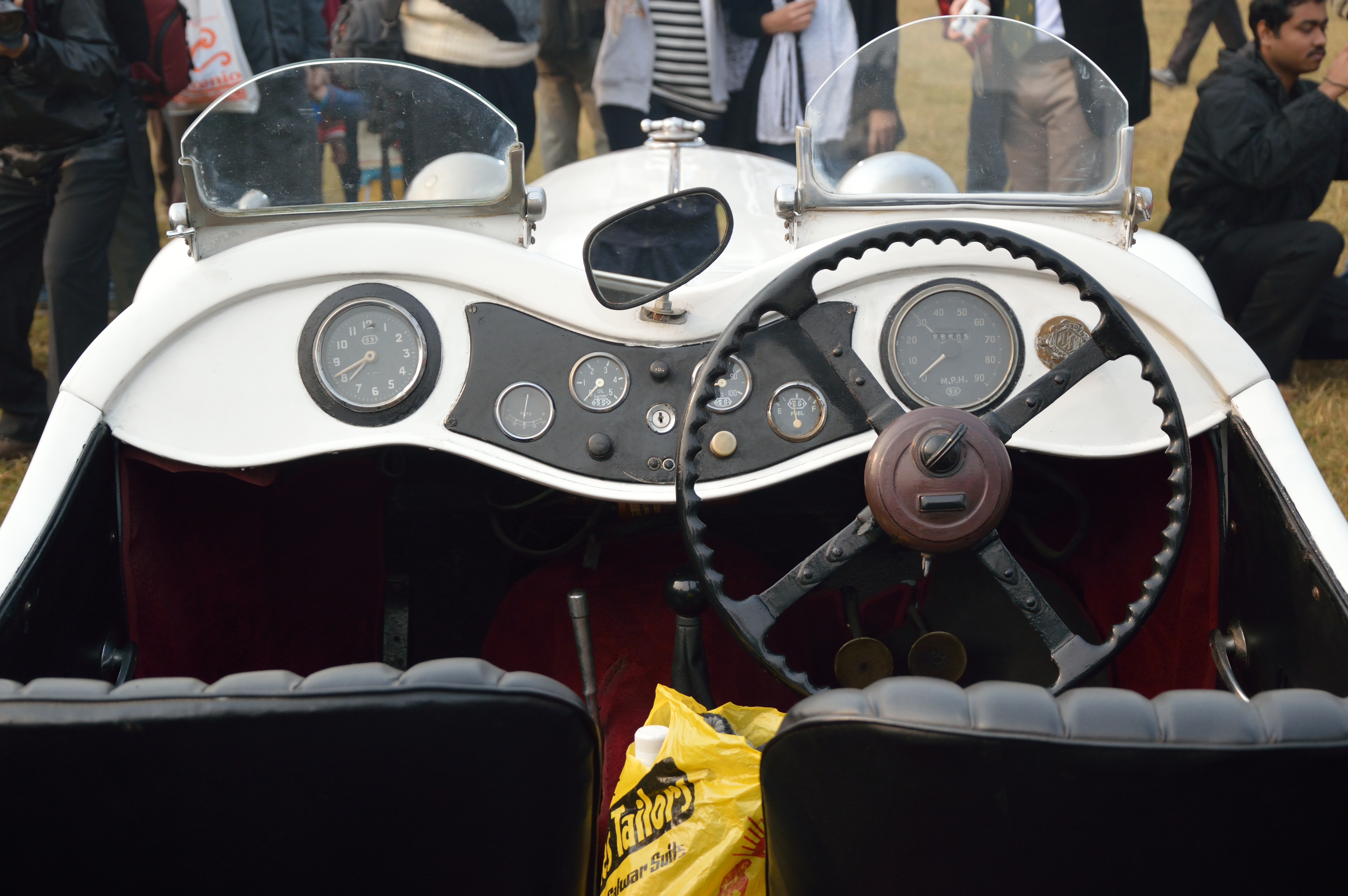
Instrument panel of a 1936 tourer

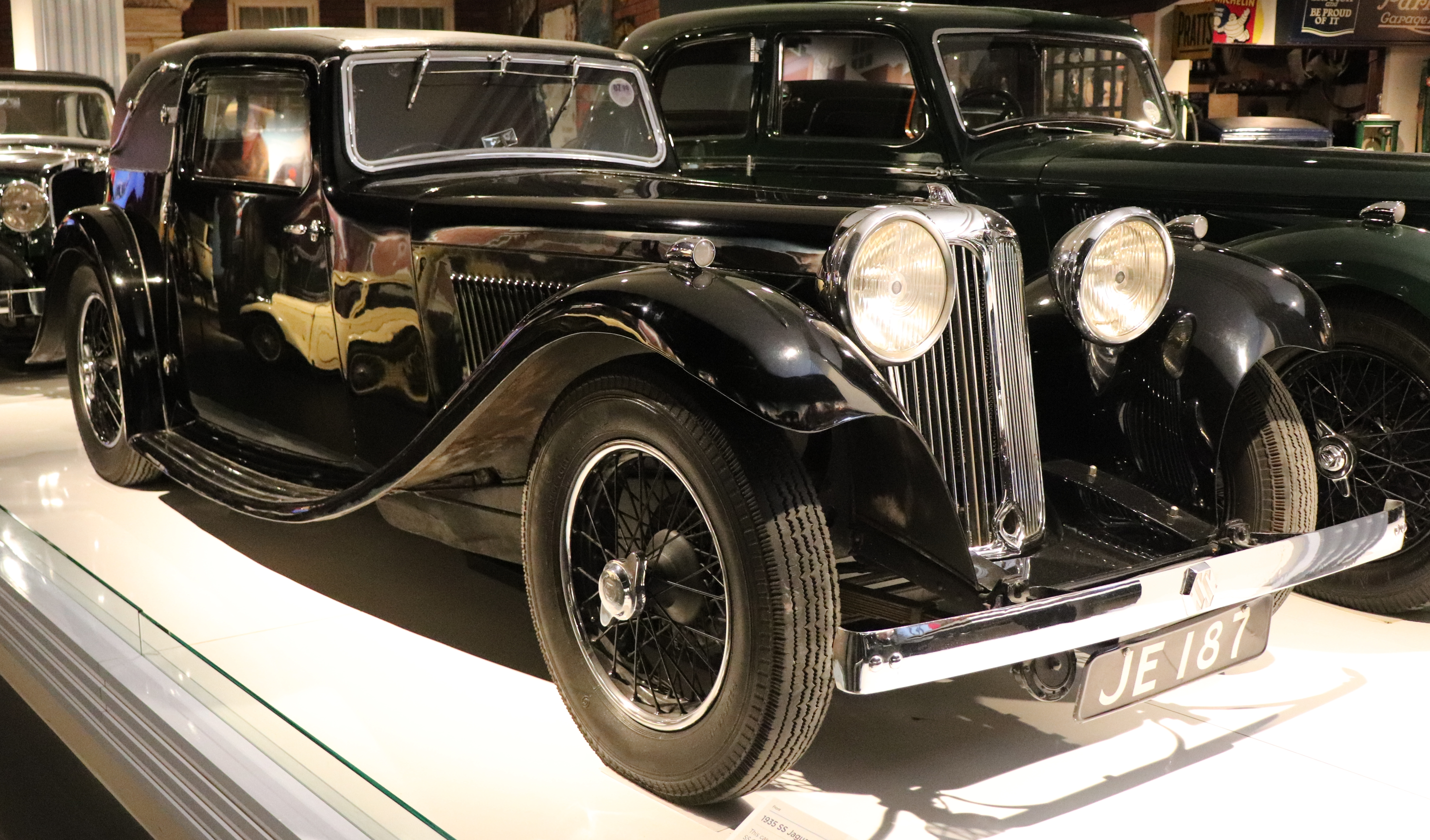
1933 four-seater fixed-head coupé

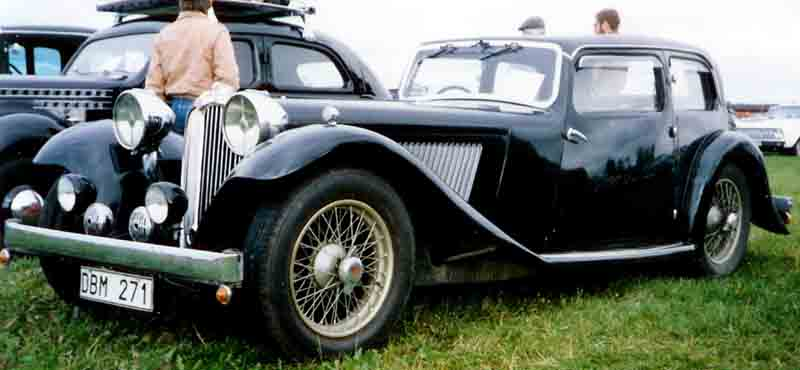
1933 four-seater sports saloon

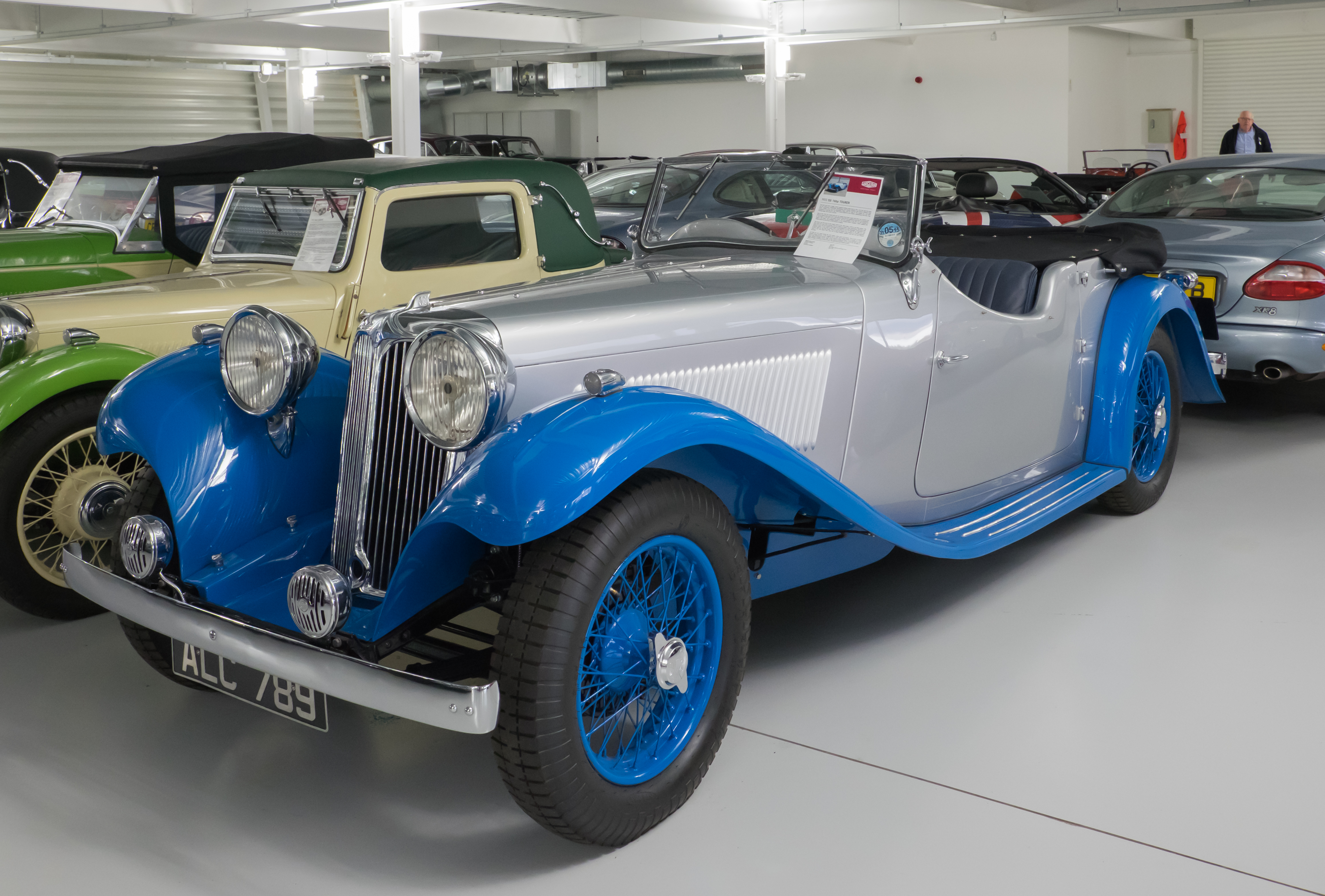
1933 16hp Tourer

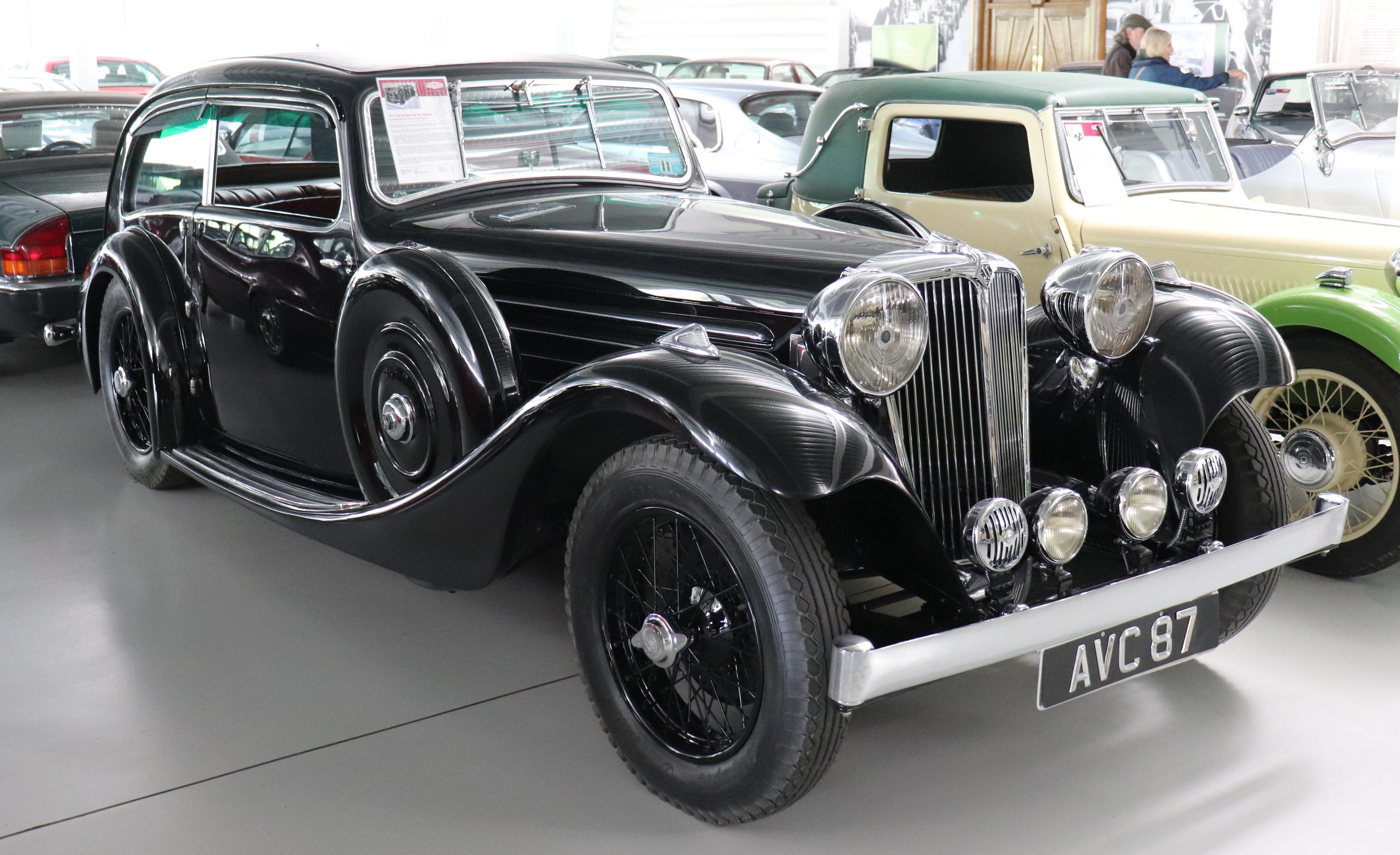
1935 Airline sports saloon

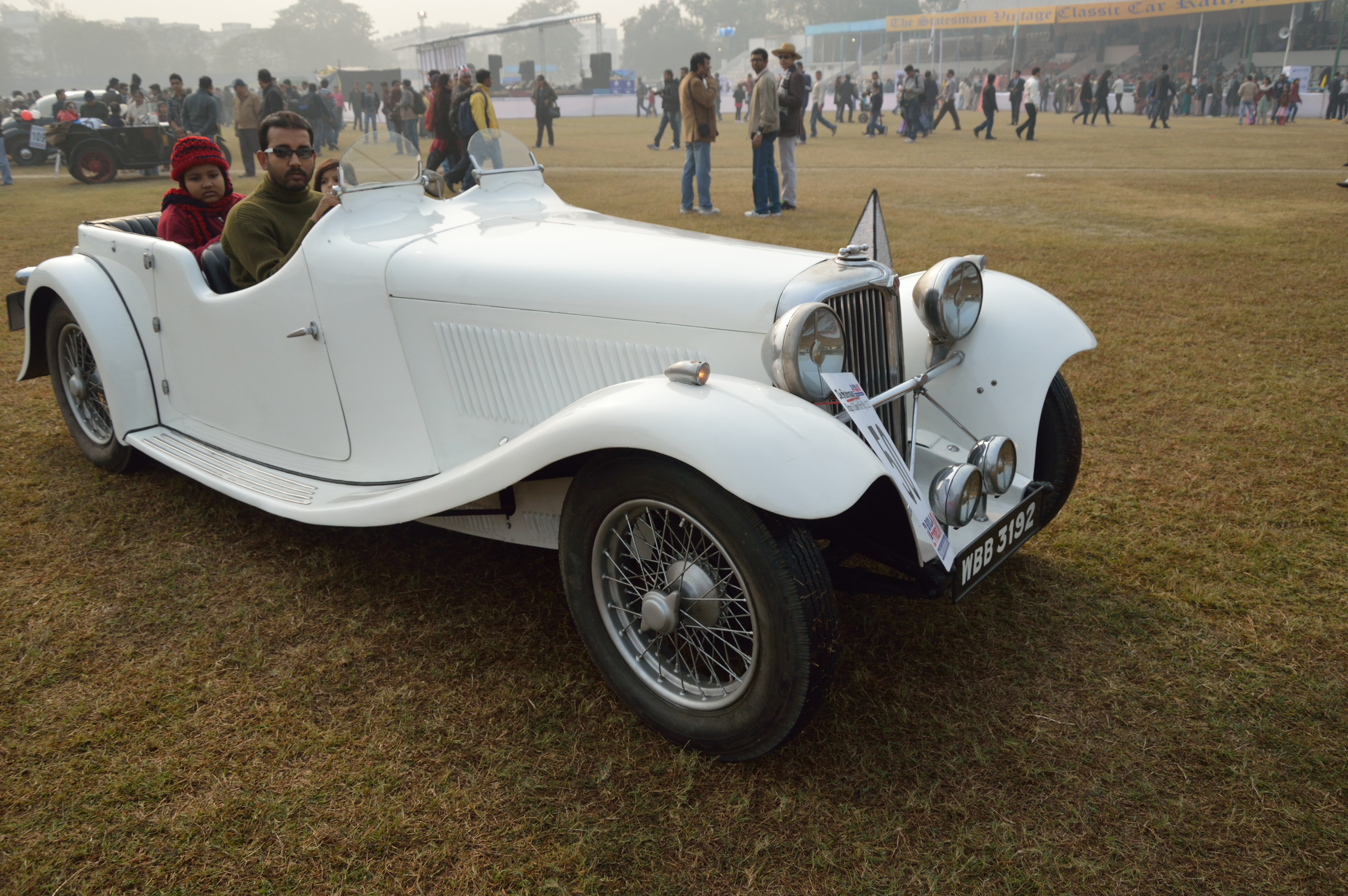
1936 Tourer

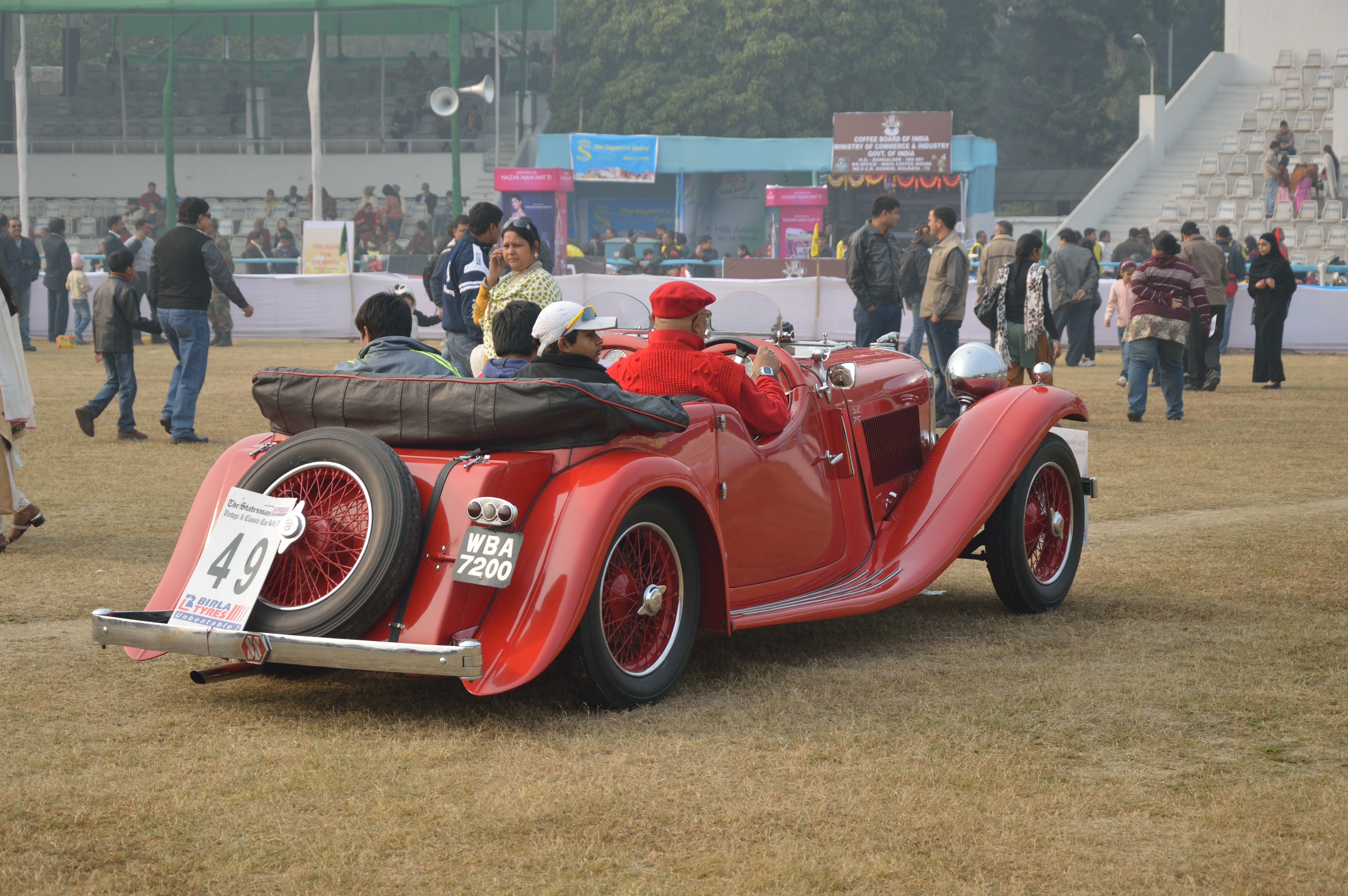
1936 Tourer (rear)
