= Standard Fourteen =

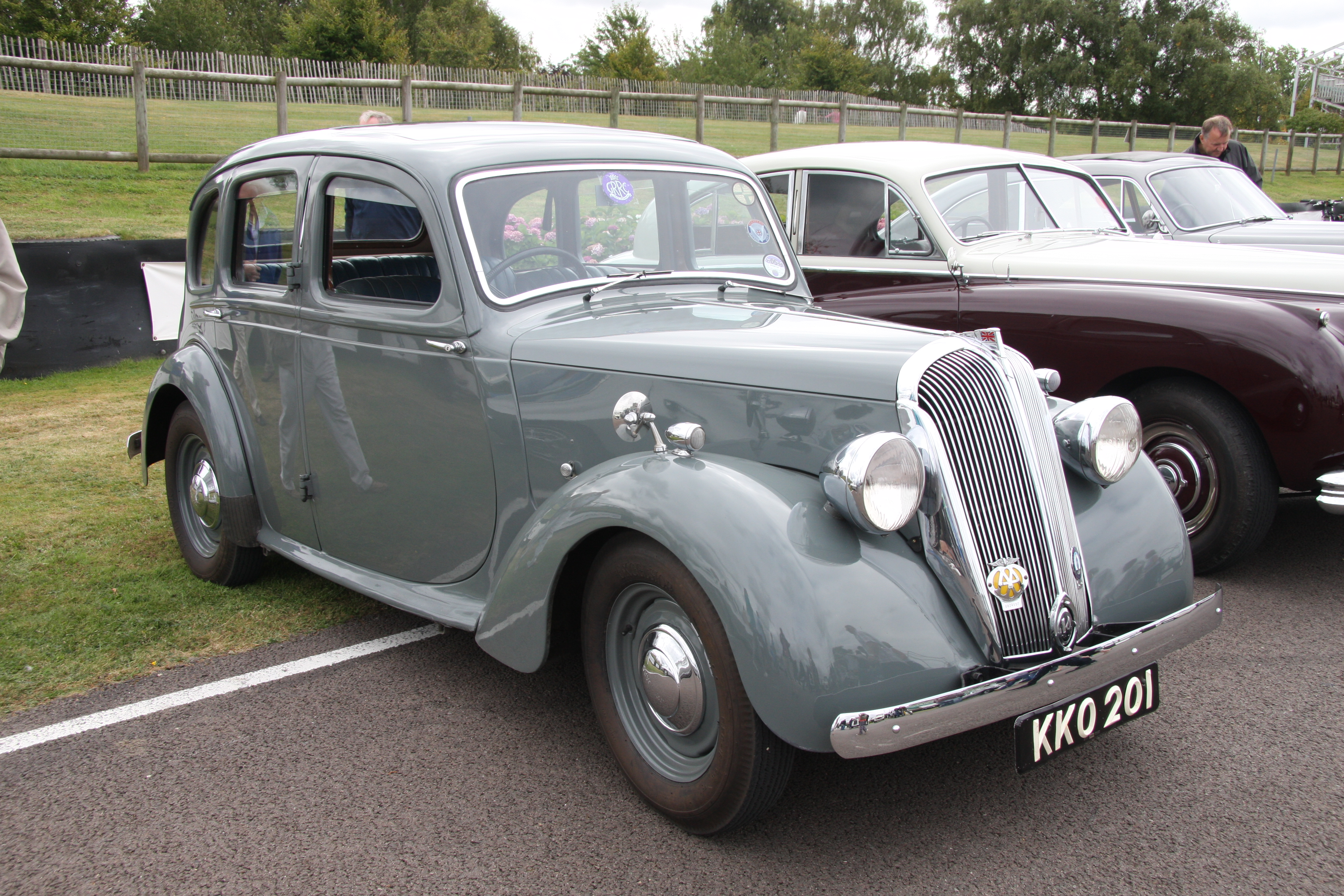
- 1948 Standard Fourteen Saloon

Overview
- Manufacturer: Standard Motor Company
- Also called: Standard 14
- Production: 1945–1948; 22,229 built
- Assembly: United Kingdom; Australia

Body and chassis
- Body style: 4-door saloon 2-door drophead coupe estate car
- Related: Standard Twelve

Powertrain
- Engine: 1,776 cc (108.4 cu in) Straight-4 side-valve
- Transmission: Four-speed manual

Dimensions
- Length: 165 in (4,191 mm)
- Width: 63 in (1,600 mm)
- Height: 63 in (1,600 mm)

Chronology
- Predecessor: Standard Flying Fourteen
- Successor: Standard Vanguard

The Standard Fourteen is a British automobile produced by the Standard Motor Company from 1945 to 1948.

The Fourteen was offered as a four-door saloon on a 100-inch wheelbase with a 1,776 cc (108.4 cu in) side valve four-cylinder engine. Drophead coupe and estate car variants were also offered. The post-war model could be distinguished from its predecessor by a lack of bonnet louvres.

The Standard Fourteen was a modified prewar 12 hp car fitted with a 14 hp engine option. The engine and transmission from the Fourteen were also used in the Jaguar 1½ Litre (retrospectively known as the Jaguar Mk IV).

Press reports praised the economy, smooth running, roominess and finish of the Fourteen. Luggage was relegated to an external folding bumper carrier, which at the time was not unusual.

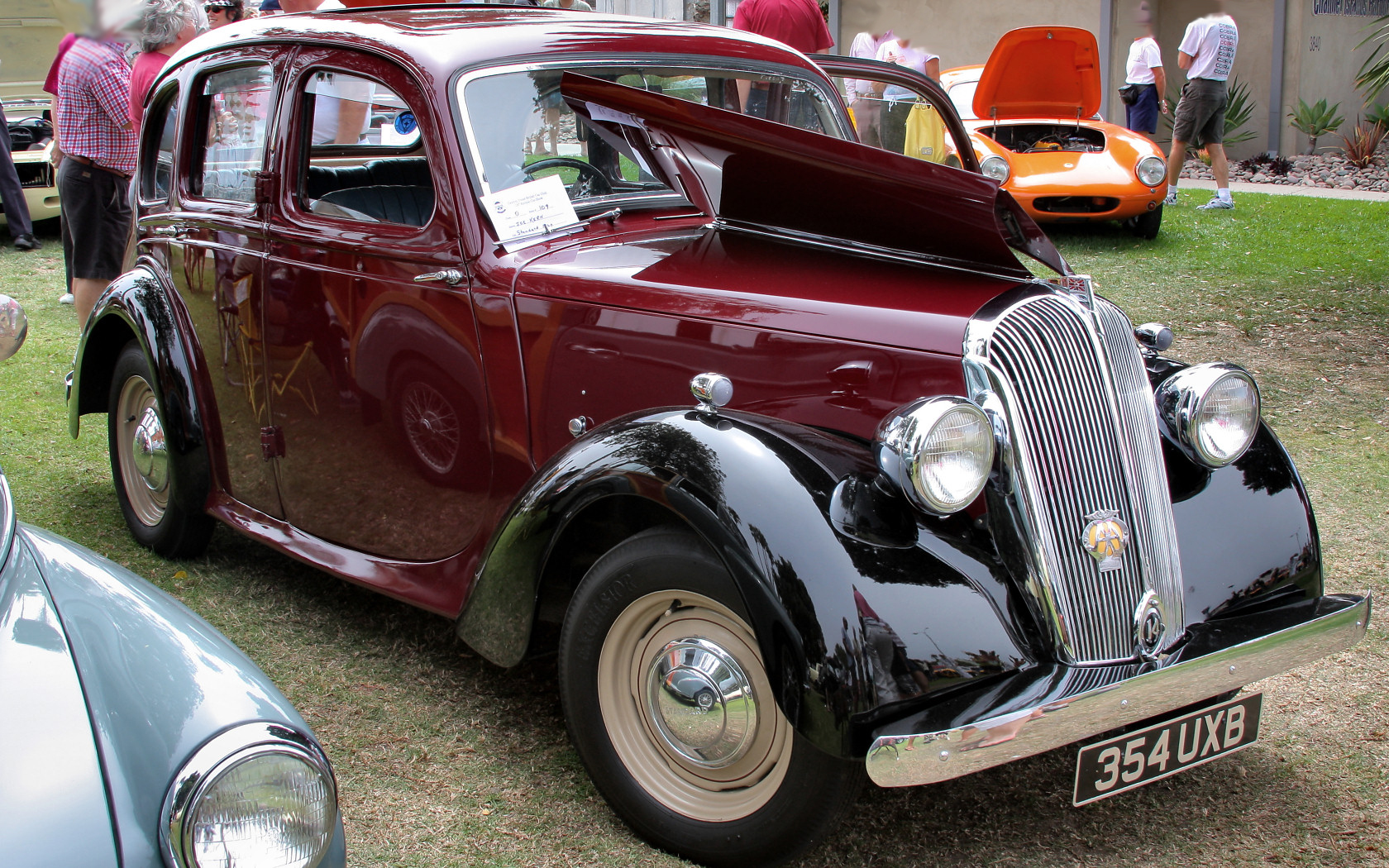
1948 Standard Fourteen saloon front view

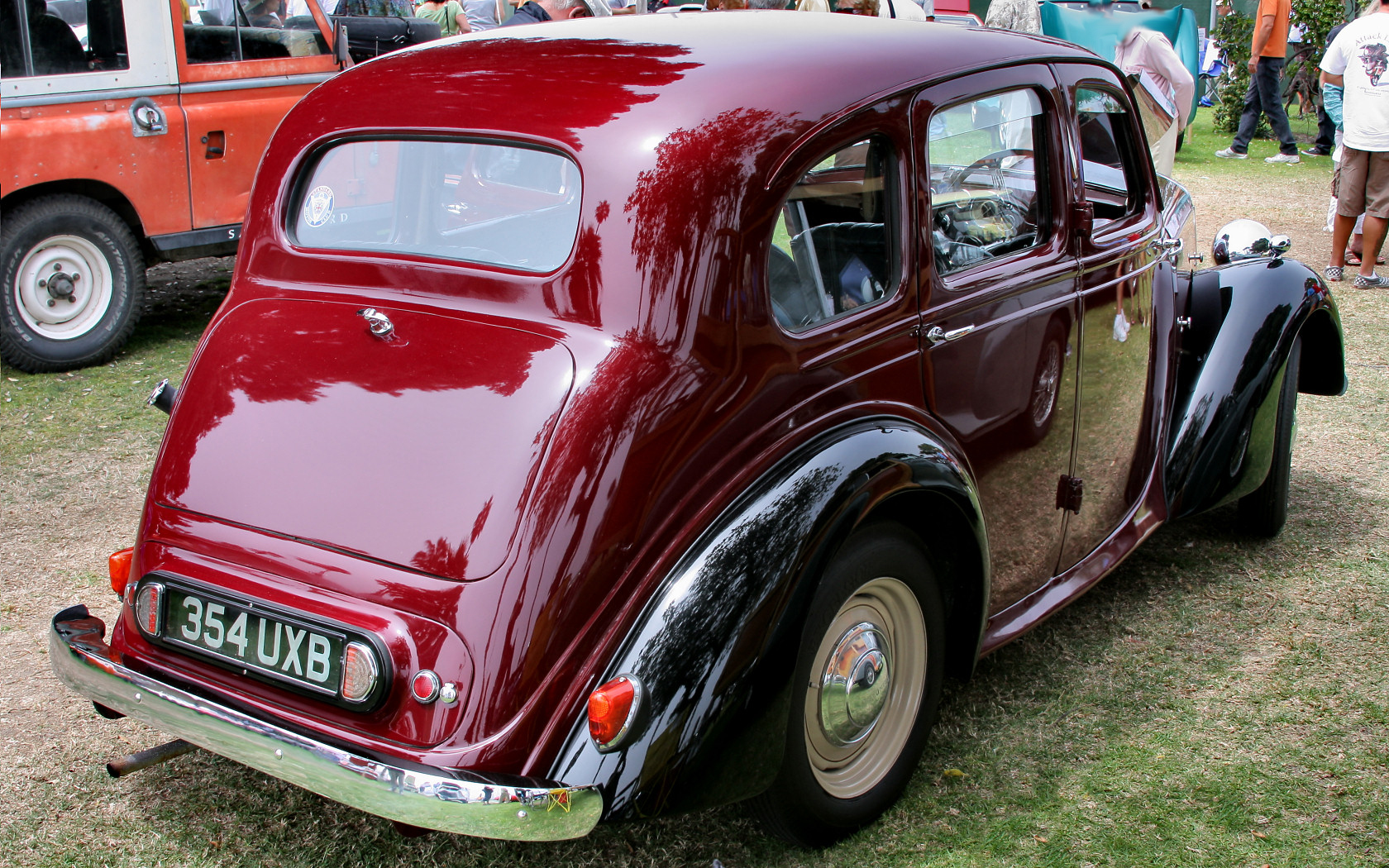
1948 Standard Fourteen saloon rear view
