= Standard Vanguard =

Motor vehicle made in England

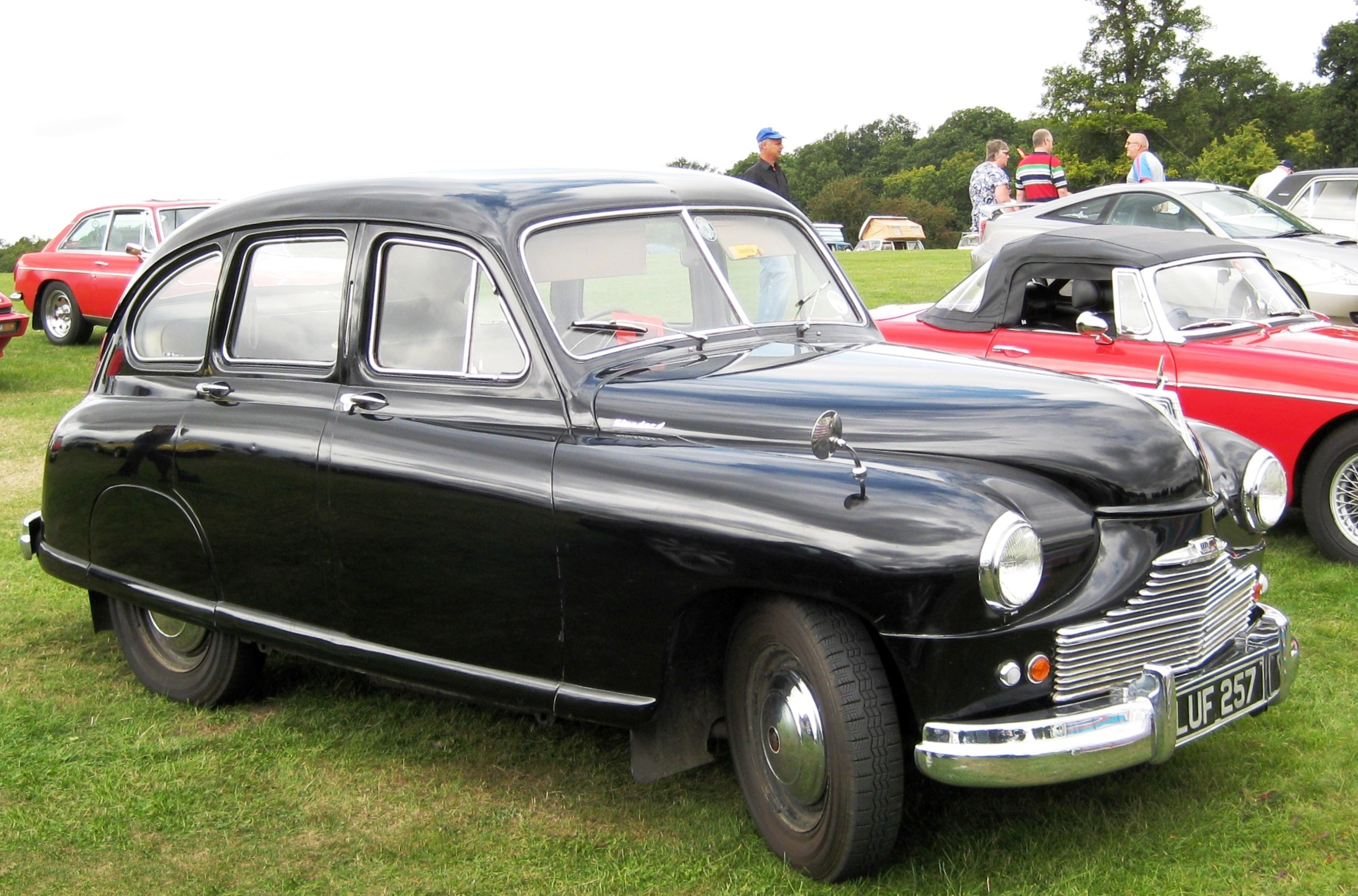
- 1951 Standard Vanguard Phase I Saloon

Overview
- Manufacturer: Standard Motor Company
- Production: 1948–1963
- Assembly: United Kingdom; Australia; New Zealand (Motor Assemblies)

Chronology
- Predecessor: Standard Fourteen
- Successor: Triumph 2000; Standard Atlas (Utility models)

The Standard Vanguard is a car which was produced by the Standard Motor Company in Coventry, England, from 1947 until 1963.

The car, announced in July 1947, was completely new, with no resemblance to previous models. Designed in 1945, it was Standard's first post-World War II car and intended for export around the world. It was also the first model to carry the new Standard badge, which was a heavily stylised representation of the wings of a griffin.

In the wake of World War II, many potential customers in the UK and in English-speaking export markets had recently experienced several years of military or naval service, and therefore a car name related to the Royal Navy carried a greater resonance than it would for later generations. The name of the Standard Vanguard recalled HMS Vanguard, the last of the Royal Navy's battleships, launched in 1944 amid much media attention; permission to use the name involved Standard in extensive negotiations with senior Royal Navy personnel.

The Vanguard was first exhibited to the public at the Brussels Motor Show in February 1948. It began to come off the assembly lines in the middle of 1948 but all production was allotted to the export trade. An estate car and a utility pick up version were announced in September, and then a 12 cwt delivery van. Aprons were fitted over the Vanguard's rear wheels from September 1949.

In 1950, the Vanguard and the Triumph Renown were the first cars to be fitted with a Laycock de Normanville overdrive. The Laycock overdrive operated on the second and third gears of the three-speed transmission, creating, in effect, a five-speed gearbox.

== Vanguard Phase I ==
Standard Vanguard Phase I
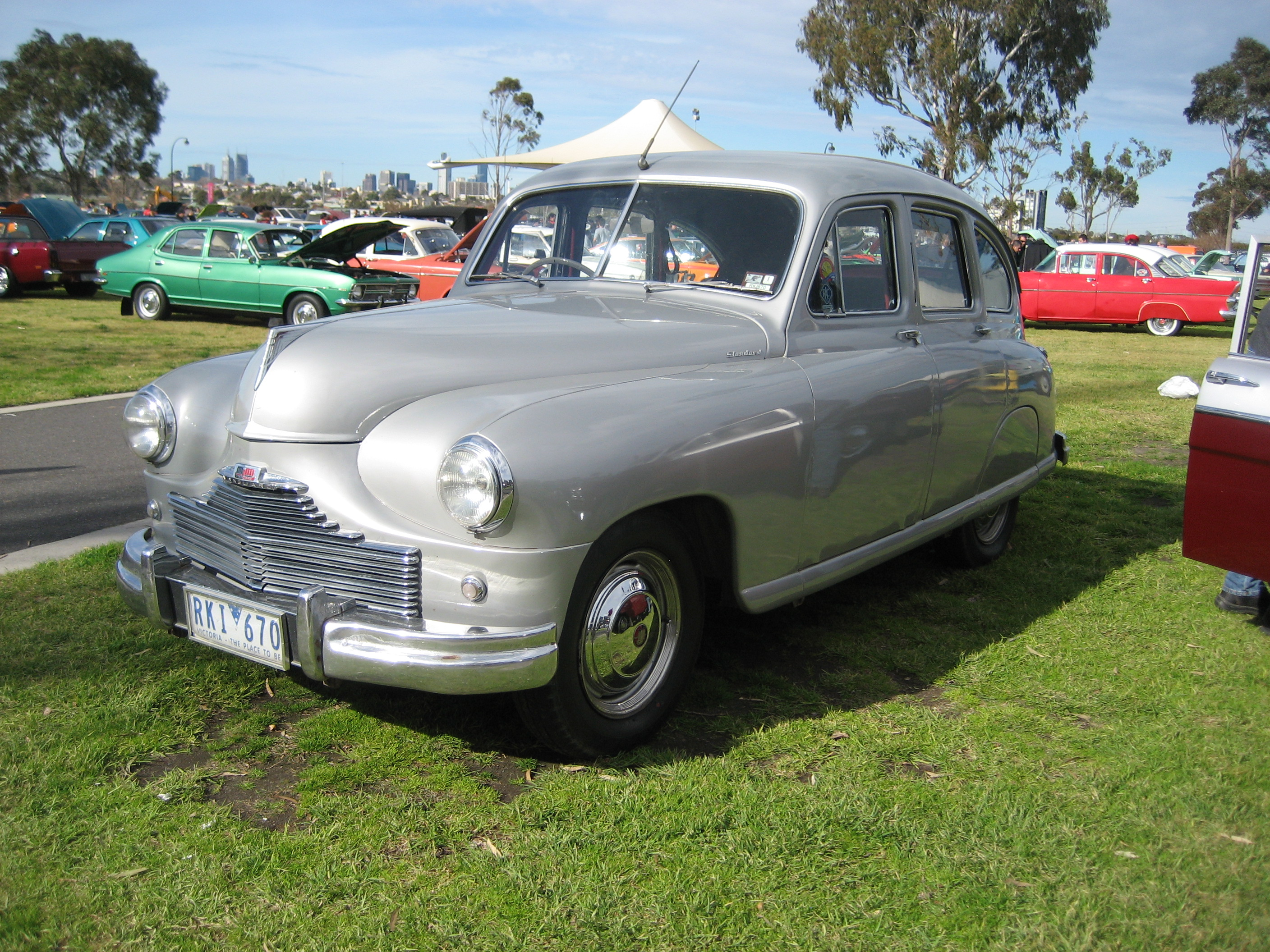
- Standard Vanguard Phase I Saloon

Overview
- Production: 1947–1953; 174,799 made
- Designer: Walter Belgrove

Body and chassis
- Body style: 4-door saloon; 4-door estate car; 2-door coupe utility (Australia); 2-door convertible (Belgium); 2-door van

Powertrain
- Engine: 2088 cc Standard I4
- Transmission: 3-speed manual Overdrive optional from 1950.

Dimensions
- Wheelbase: 94 in (2,388 mm)
- Length: 166 in (4,216 mm)
- Width: 69 in (1,753 mm)
- Height: 64 in (1,626 mm)

=== Chassis and running gear ===
The car used a conventional chassis on which was mounted the slab sided body. The chassis members were made up of pressed-steel channel sections welded into a box chassis with cruciform bracing. Suspension was independent at the front with coil springs, and a live axle and leaf springs at the rear. Front and rear anti-roll bars were fitted. The brakes were hydraulic with 9-inch (228 mm) drums all round, and to make the most of the interior space a column gear change was used initially on the right of the steering wheel then later on the left.

=== Engine ===
The same wet liner engine was used throughout the range until the advent of the Six model in 1960, and was an overhead-valve unit of 85 mm (3.35 in) bore and 92 mm (3.62 in) stroke with single Solex downdraught carburettor. The compression ratio was 6.7:1, maximum power 68 bhp (51 kW). Wet cylinder liners were fitted. The engine was essentially the same as that made by Standard for the Ferguson TE20 tractor, with some changes for automobile use.

=== Transmission ===
At first, the transmission included a three-speed gearbox with synchromesh on all forward ratios, controlled using a column-mounted lever. The option of Laycock-de-Normanville overdrive was announced at the end of 1949 and became available in June 1950, priced for UK buyers at slightly under £45 including purchase tax. Laycock overdrives were cable-operated on top gear until 1954 when an electric solenoid was added; from now on the overdrive operated on the top two gears.

=== Broadening the range of available bodies ===
An estate car joined the range in 1950. There was also a panel van, capable of a 12 long cwt (1,344 lb; 610 kg) payload, and a pickup version. These three models were used extensively by the RAF, with the 12-cwt van being the most common variant. For Belgium only, some convertibles were made by the Impéria Automobiles coach-building company.

=== Road test data ===
A car tested by The Motor magazine in 1949 had a top speed of 78.7 mph (126.7 km/h) and could accelerate from 0–60 mph (97 km/h) in 21.5 seconds. A fuel consumption of 22.9 miles per imperial gallon (12.3 L/100 km; 19.1 mpg_{‑US}) was recorded. The test car cost £671 including taxes.

=== Commercial ===
In line with the post-war British export drive, virtually the total output was exported for the first two years of production and only in 1950 did significant home market deliveries start. The Vanguard was intended to achieve export sales, with a particular focus on Australia. During the immediate post-war period, cars were in short supply, creating a "seller's market". Restricted availability of the Vanguard helped attract willing buyers.

Closer to home, in the slowly recovering West German market the Standard Vanguard recorded 405 sales in 1950, making it the country's third most popular imported automobile, in a list otherwise featuring much smaller cars from French and Italian manufacturers. Vanguard sales in 1950 accounted for more than 70% of the British cars sold in West Germany that year, customers of other UK manufacturers having reportedly been caught out in the late 1940s by the lack of a dealer network and difficulties in obtaining replacement parts.

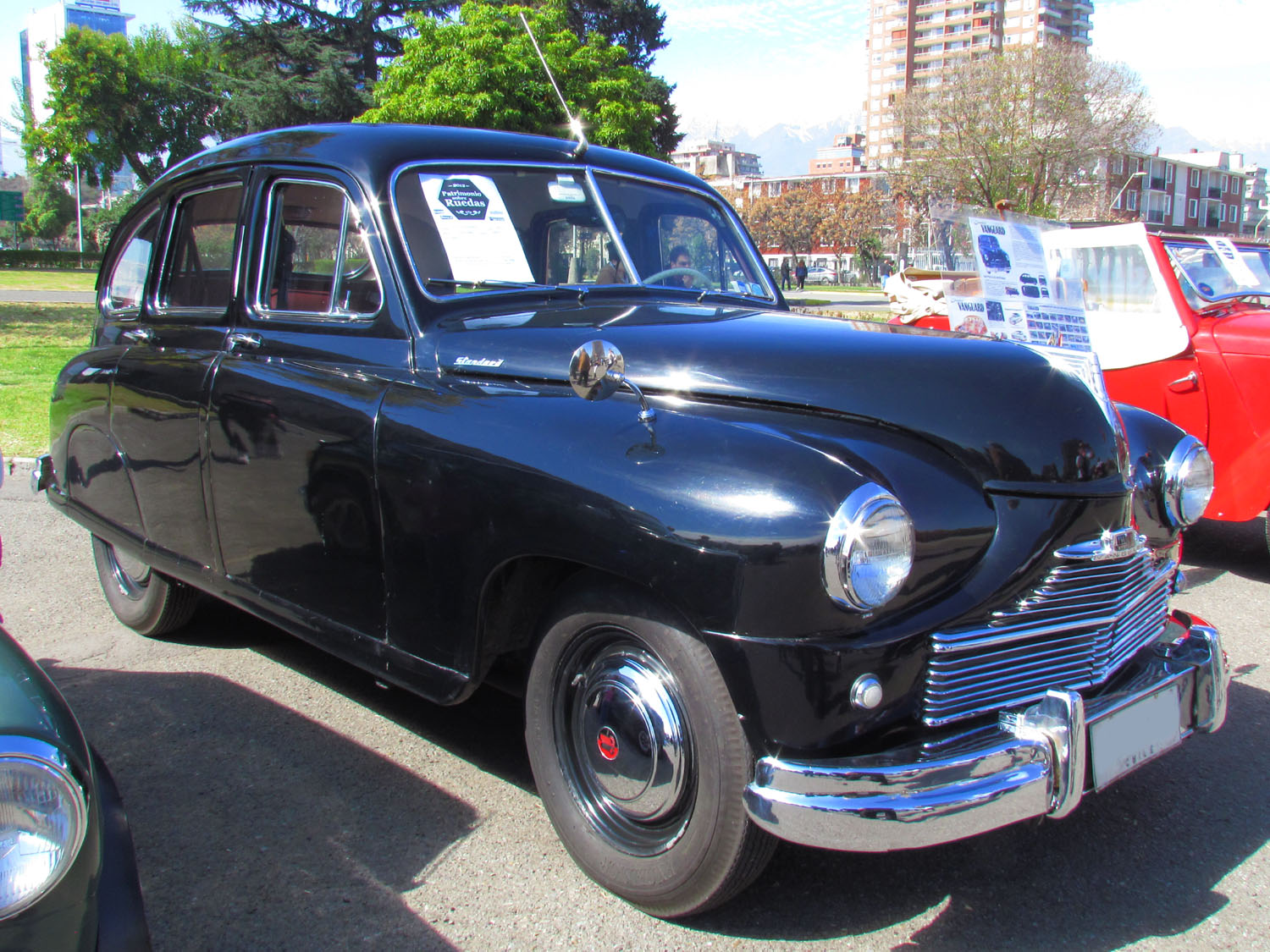
Standard Vanguard Phase I Saloon

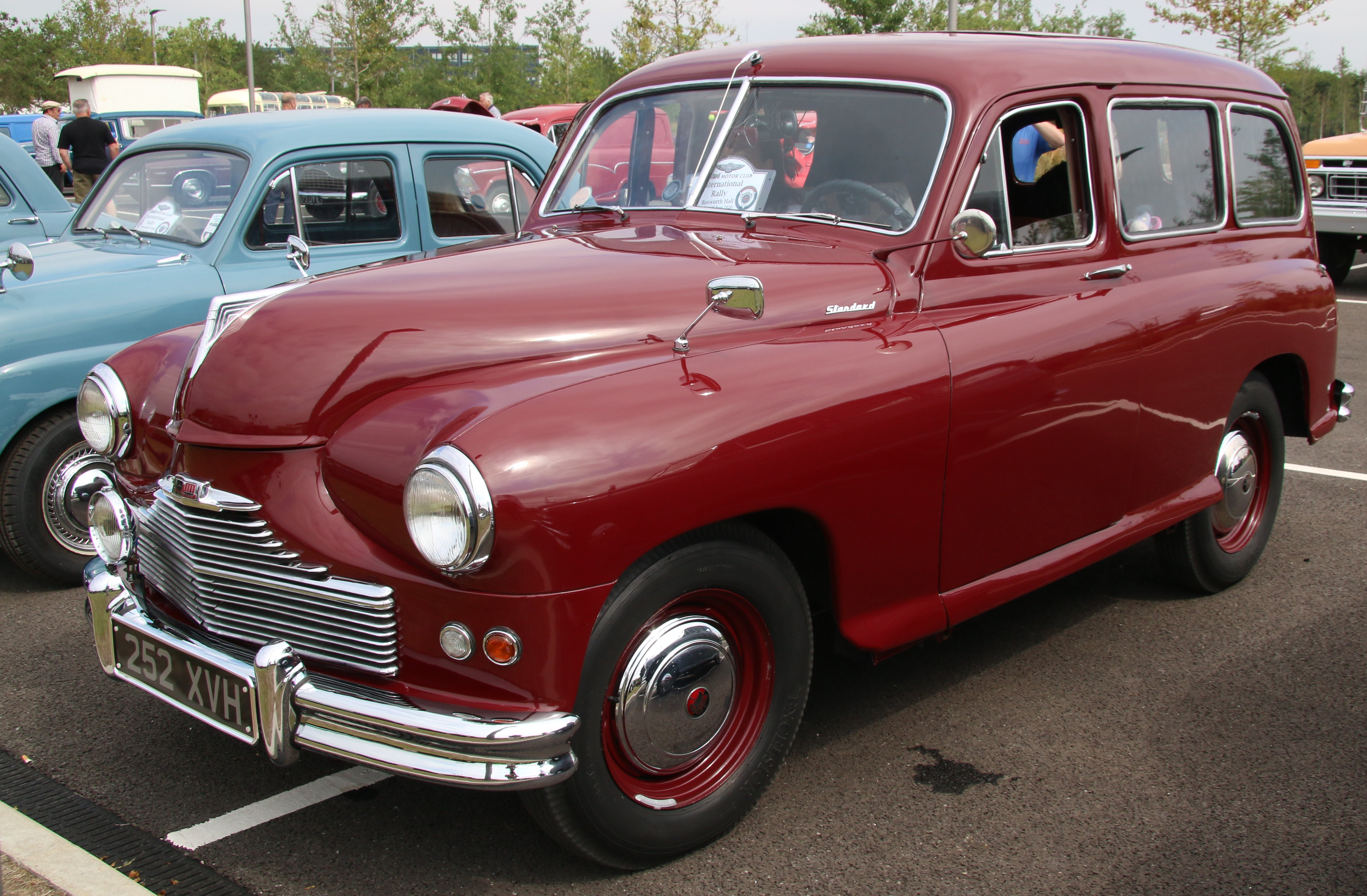
Standard Vanguard Phase I Estate

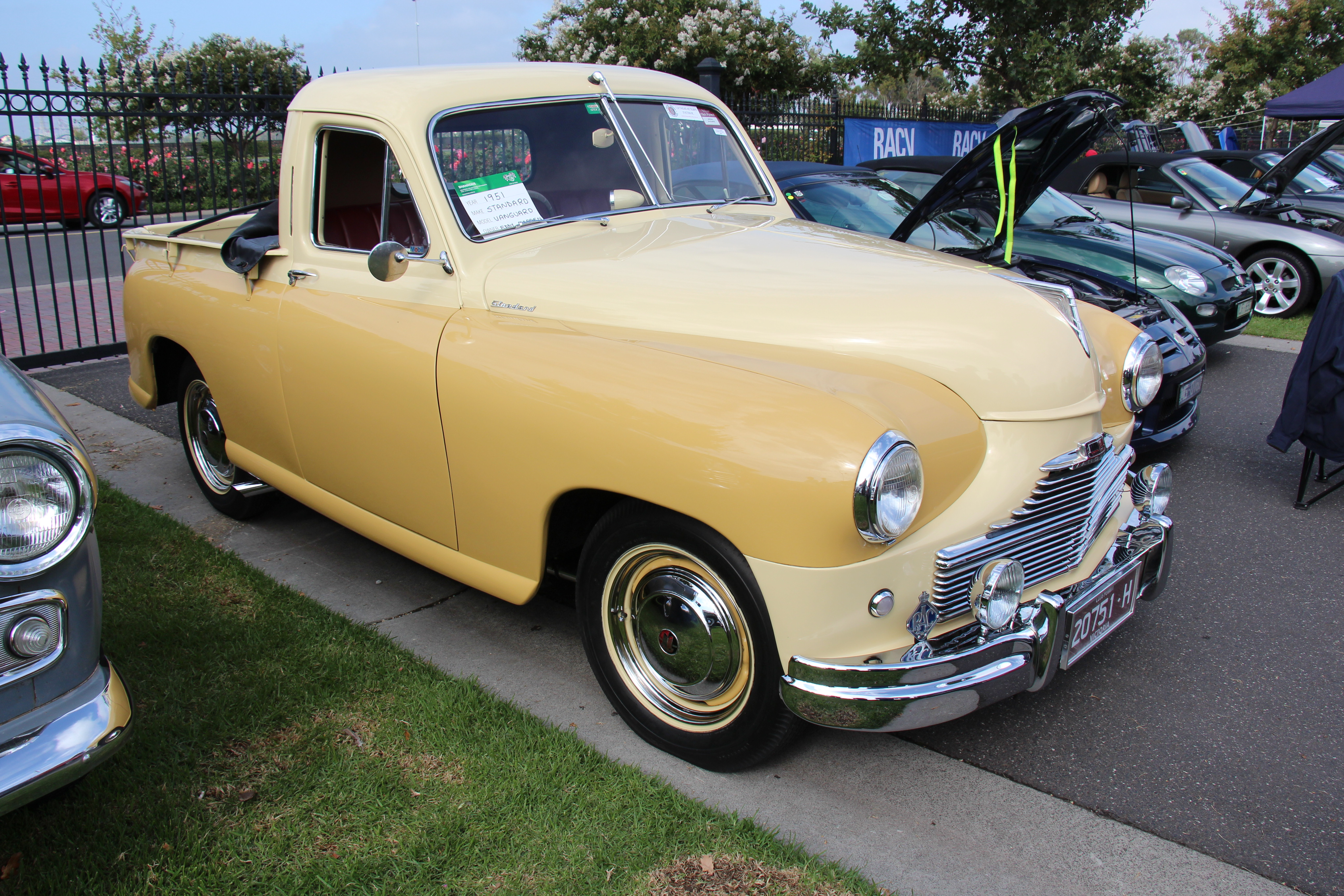
Standard Vanguard Phase I Coupe Utility

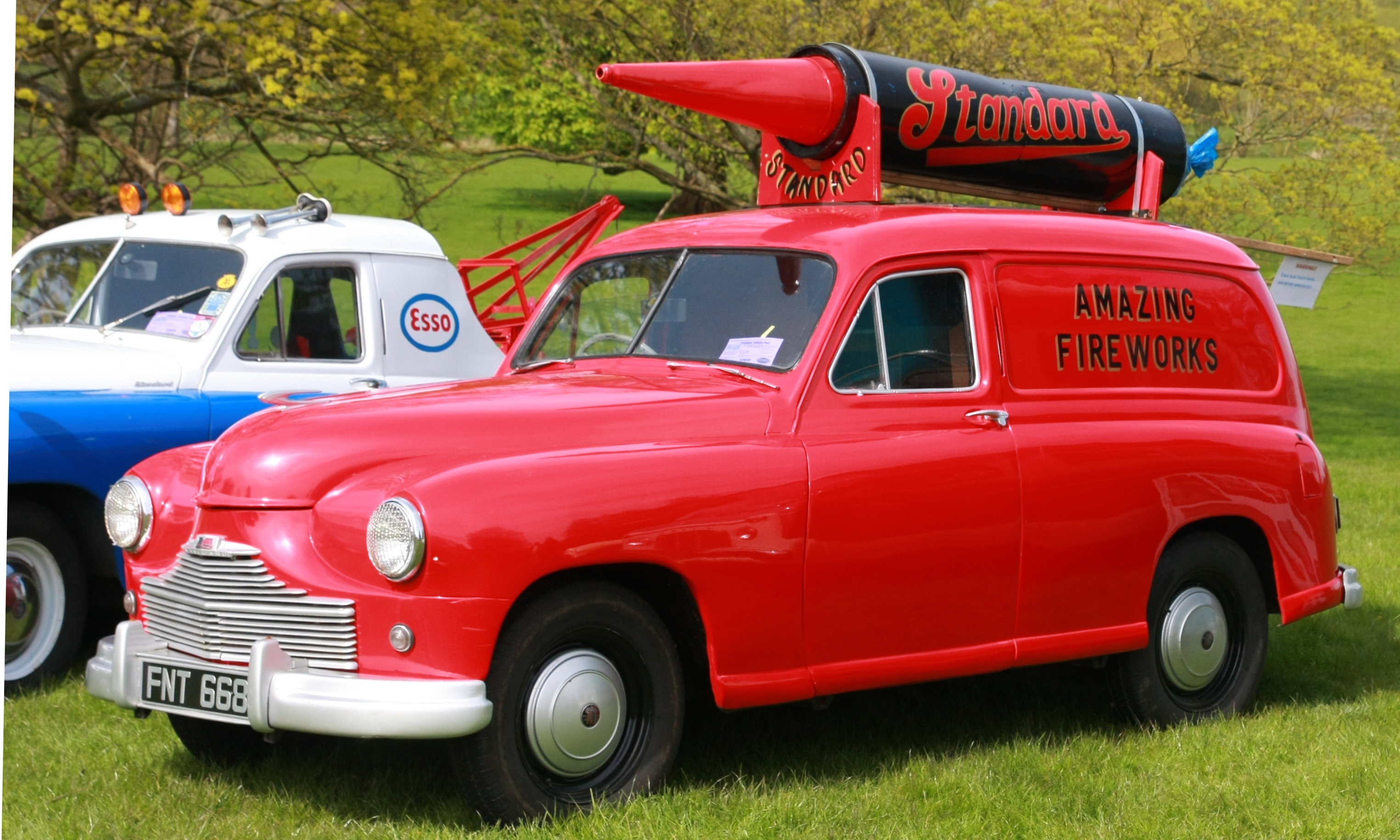
Standard Vanguard Phase I Van

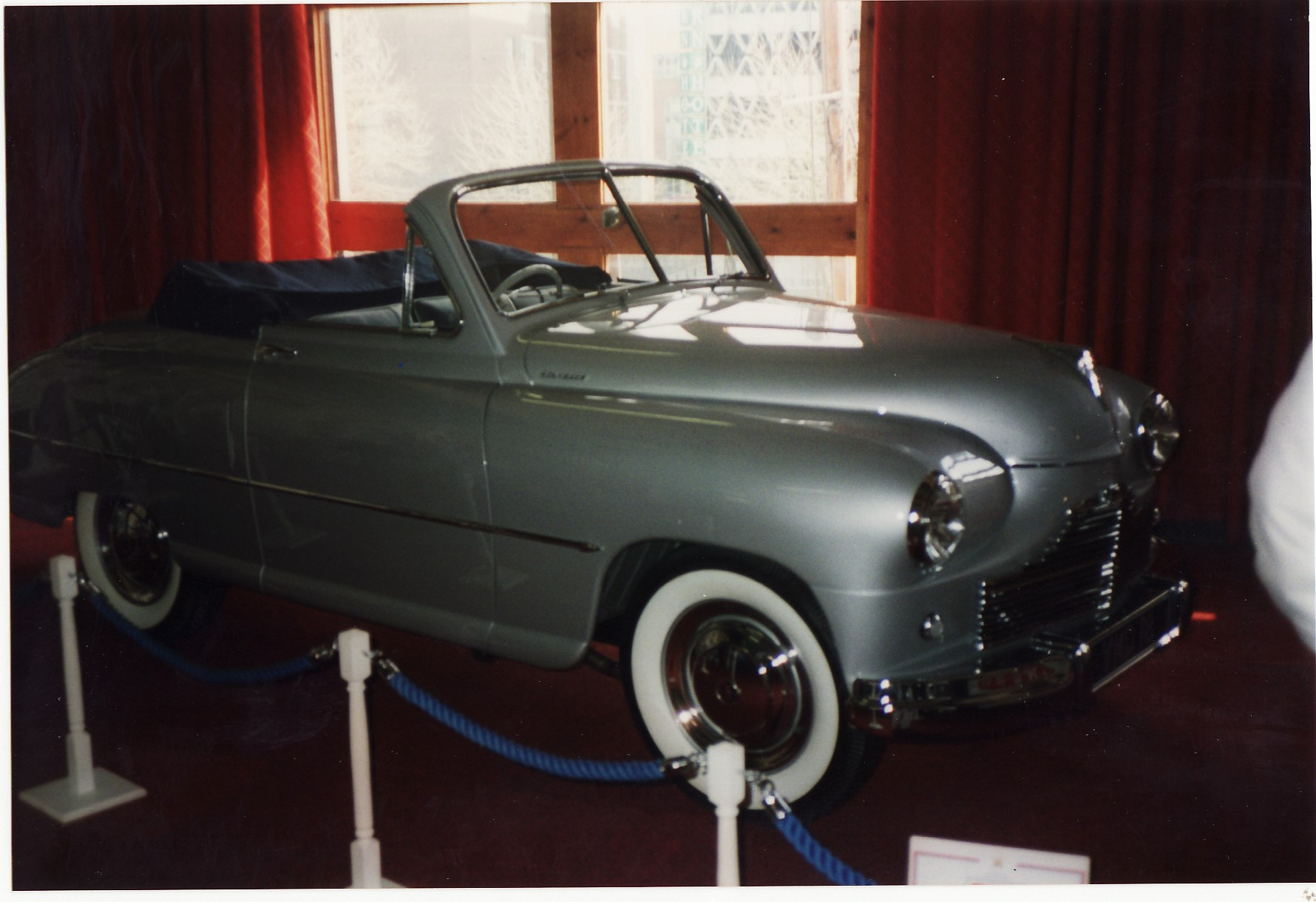
Standard Vanguard Phase I Convertible by Imperia of Belgium

=== Phase IA - 1952 facelift ===
The body was updated in 1952 with a lowered bonnet line, a wider rear window and a new grille featuring a wide horizontal chrome bar in place of the narrow, more closely packed slats of the original grille. This became known as the Phase 1A.

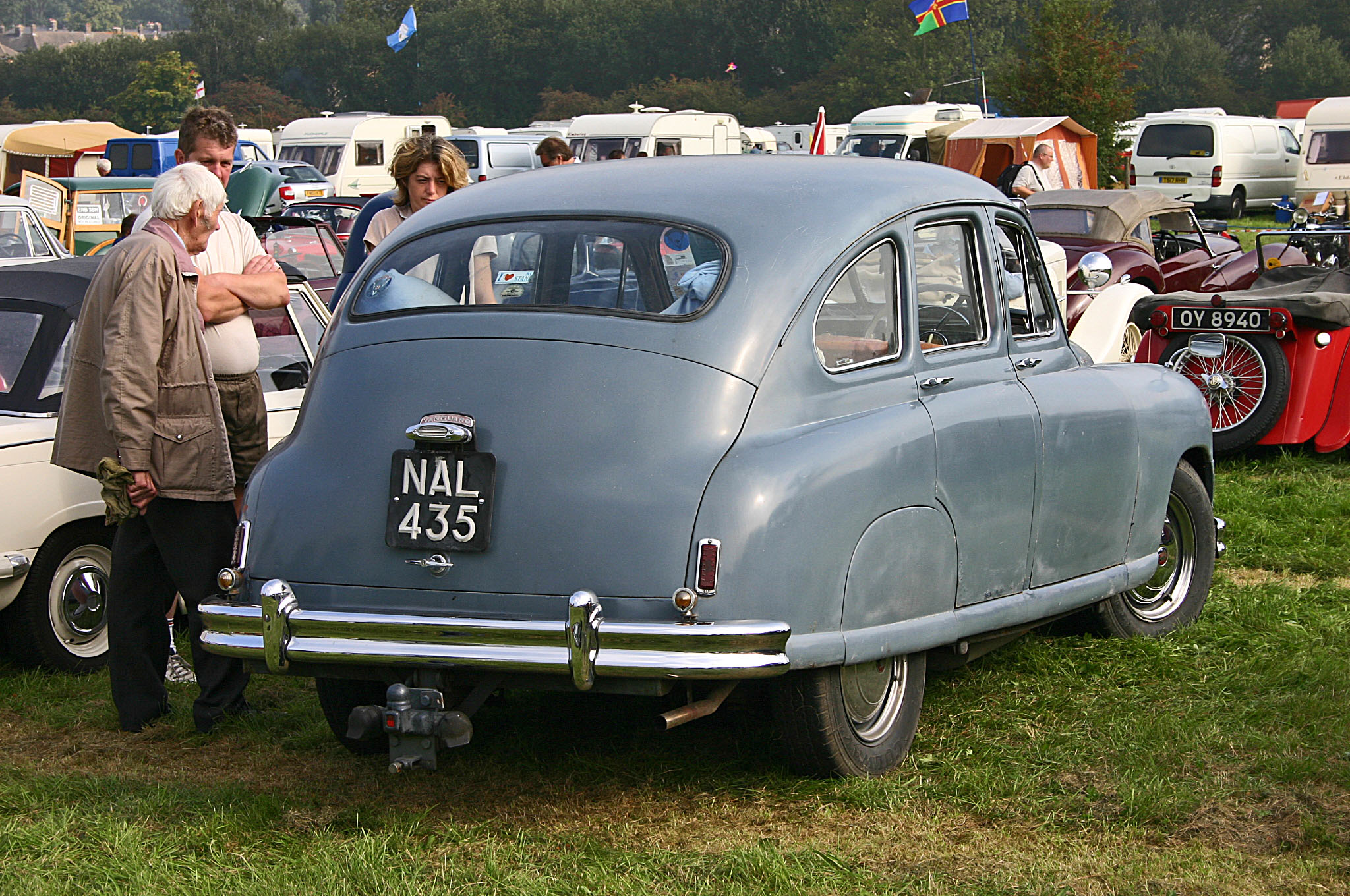
Standard Vanguard Phase 1A Saloon

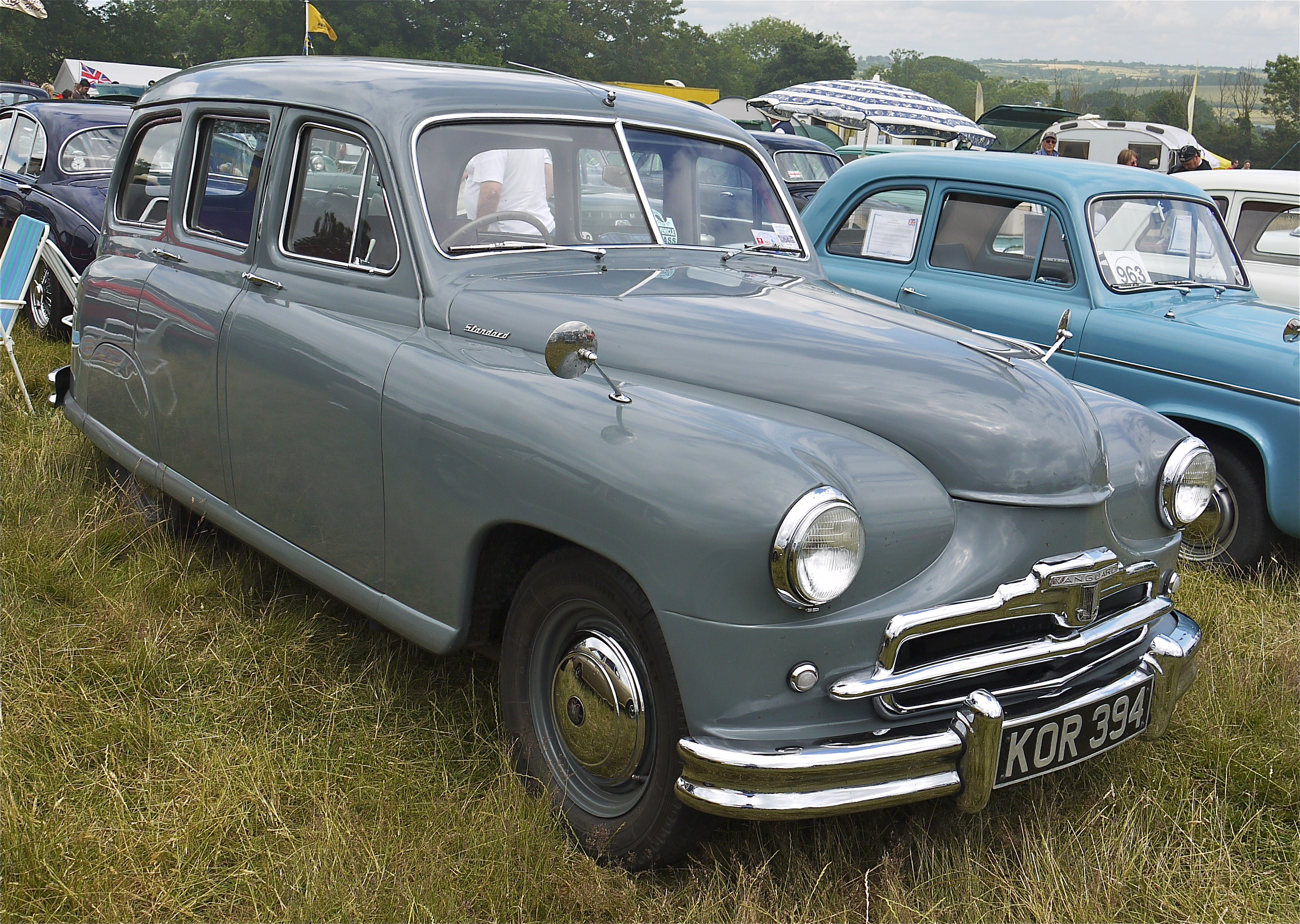
Standard Vanguard Phase 1A Estate

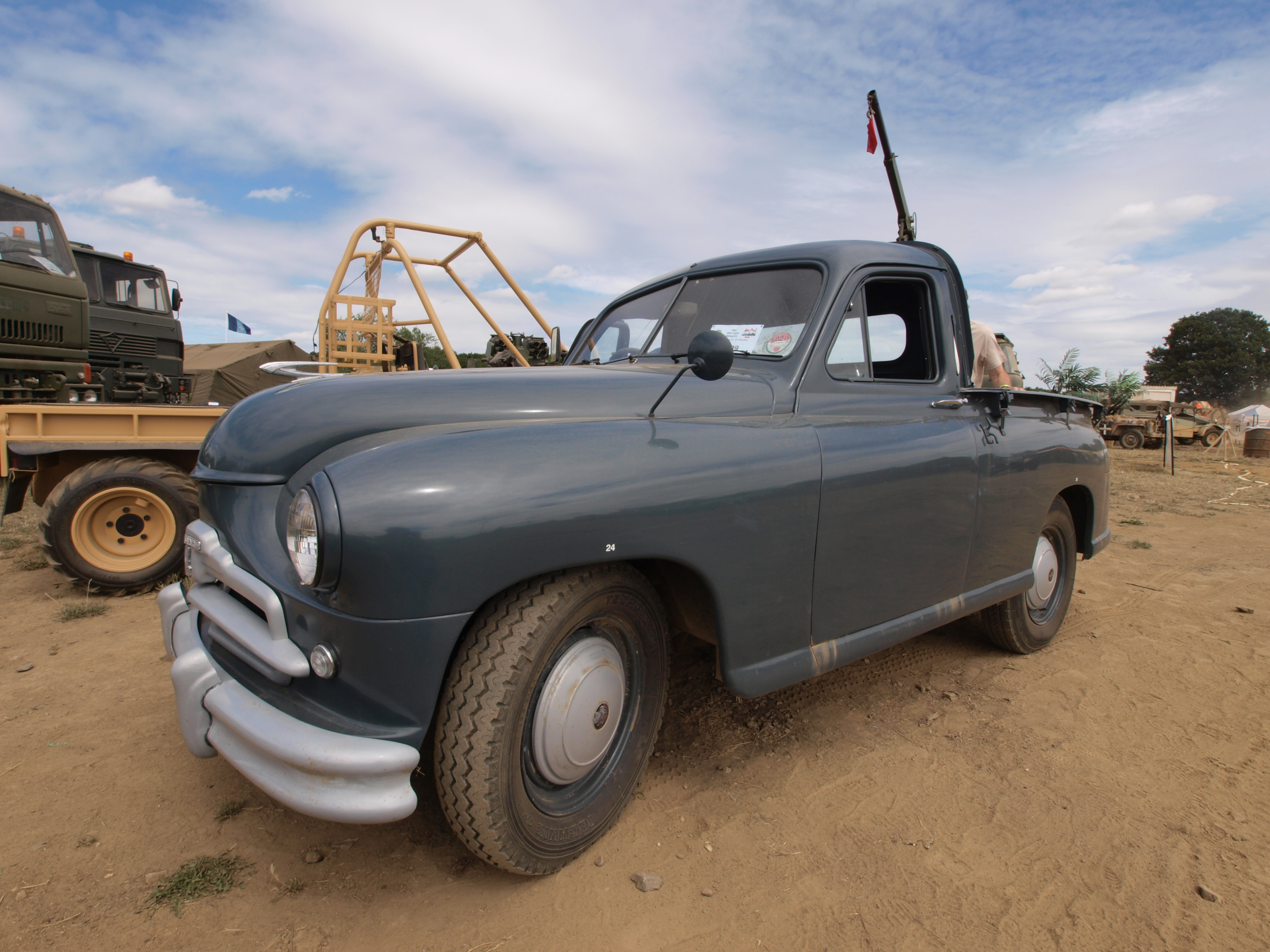
Standard Vanguard Phase 1A Pickup

== Vanguard Phase II ==
Standard Vanguard Phase II
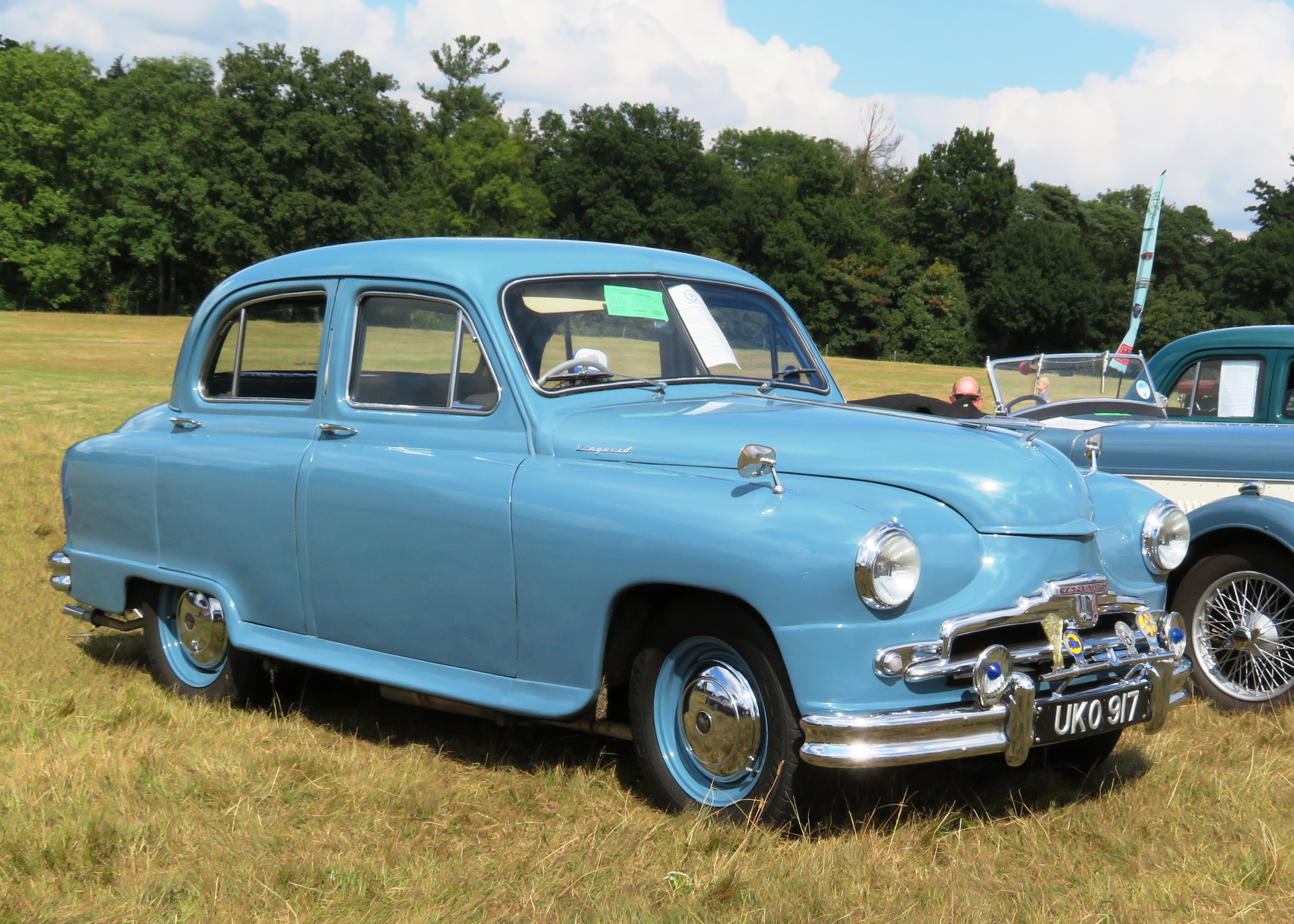
- Standard Vanguard Phase II Saloon

Overview
- Production: 1953–1956; 81,074 made

Body and chassis
- Body style: 4-door saloon; 3-door estate car; 5-door estate car; 2-door coupe utility (Australia); 2-door panel van

Powertrain
- Engine: 2088 cc Standard I4; 2092 cc Standard 20C diesel I4
- Transmission: Three speed manual Overdrive optional.

Dimensions
- Wheelbase: 94 in (2,400 mm)
- Length: 168 in (4,300 mm)
- Width: 69 in (1,800 mm)

The Swiss importer was AMAG, who assembled the Swiss market Phase I Vanguards. At the Geneva International Motor Show in March 1953 an extensive re-design was unveiled: the Phase II Vanguard was of a contemporary ponton three-box saloon design. Boot/trunk capacity increased by fifty percent in comparison to that of the Phase I, and visibility was improved with a further enlarged rear window. A new, extended, grille now encompassed the sidelights.

Mechanically there were few changes, but the clutch changed from cable to hydraulic operation and the engine compression ratio increased to 7.2:1. The previously fitted anti-roll bar was no longer used. Wider 6.00x16 tyres were fitted to improve road holding.

A car that was tested by The Motor magazine, without the optional overdrive, had a top speed of 80 mph (130 km/h) and could accelerate from 0–60 mph (97 km/h) in 19.9 seconds. A fuel consumption of 23.5 miles per imperial gallon (12.0 L/100 km; 19.6 mpg_{‑US}) was recorded.

In February 1954 Standard became the first British car maker to offer a diesel engine as a factory fitted option. The chassis was stiffened and front suspension modified to take the weight of the heavier engine. Of similar displacement to the petrol engine but of a more long-stroked design, the diesel was a Standard-built "20C" engine developed for the Ferguson tractor. The diesels fitted to the tractor were restricted to 2,200 rpm and developed 25 bhp (19 kW), but road-going engines in Vanguards had no limiter and so produced 60 bhp (45 kW) at 3,800 rpm. Performance suffered compared to the petrol models, with a top speed of about 65 mph (105 km/h). However, they retained the tractor's "Ki-Gass", de-compressor and over-fuelling systems, all of which had to be manually operated when starting the engine from cold. 1,973 diesel Vanguards were made.

In 1954 The Motor magazine tested the diesel version and recorded a top speed of 66.2 mph (106.5 km/h) acceleration from 0–50 mph (80 km/h) in 31.6 seconds and a fuel consumption of 37.5 miles per imperial gallon (7.5 L/100 km; 31.2 mpg_{‑US}). The test car, which had overdrive, cost £1,099 including taxes.

For 1955, the Australian-built coupé utility was given a re-styled tail which resulted in extra room in the cargo area. It also featured a new full-width rear window and improved cabin features. As the coupe utility variant of the Phase III style was not yet available, an updated Phase II utility was offered in 1956 with a mesh grille, two-tone paint and new interior trim.

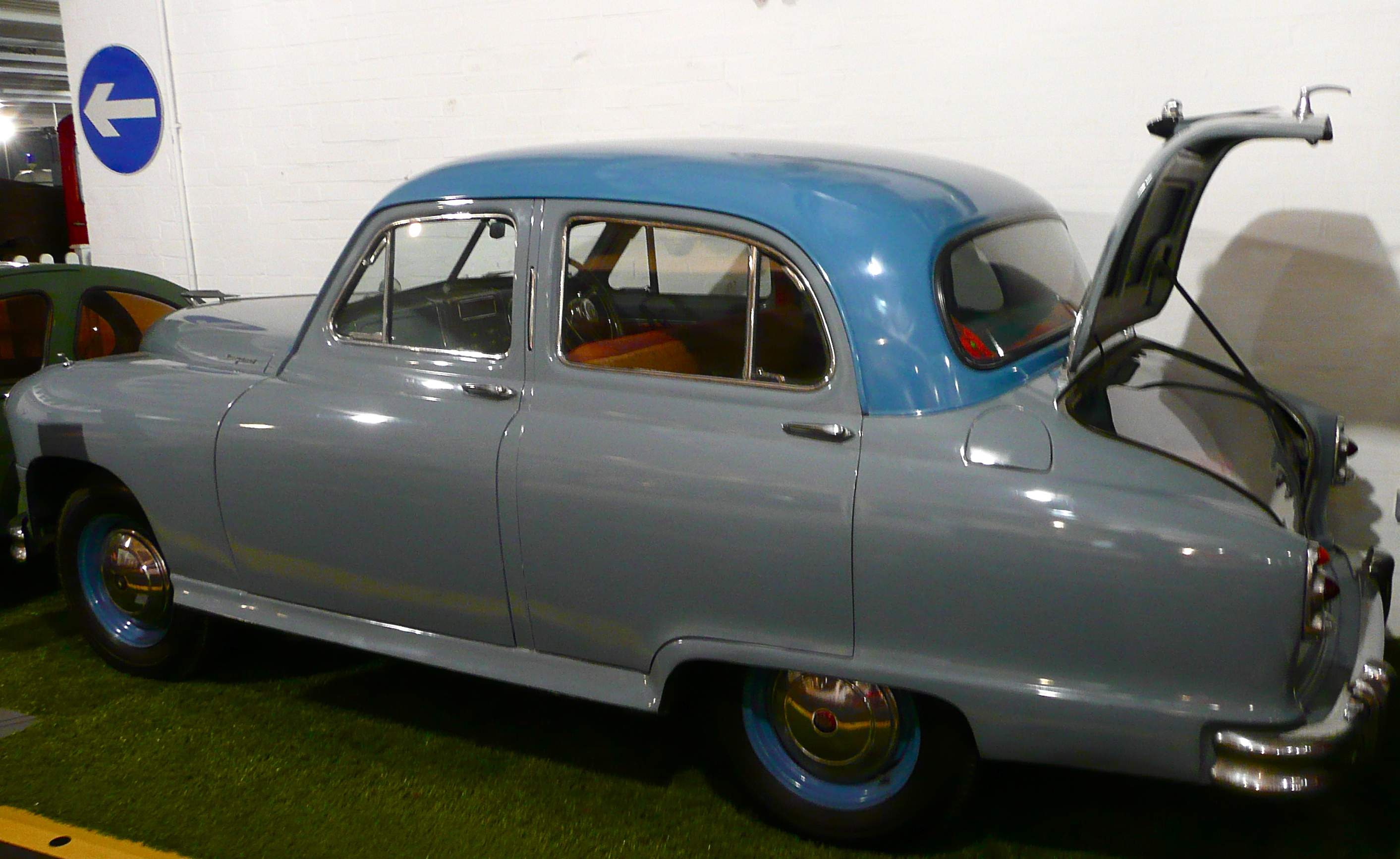
Standard Vanguard Phase II Saloon

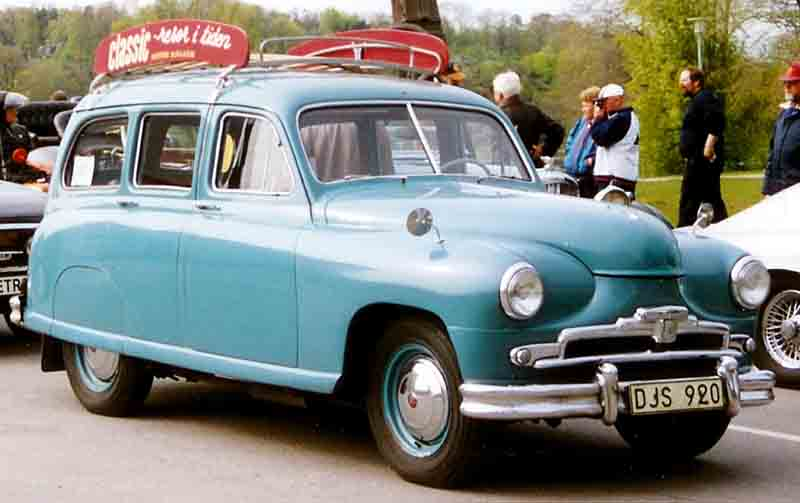
Standard Vanguard Phase II Estate

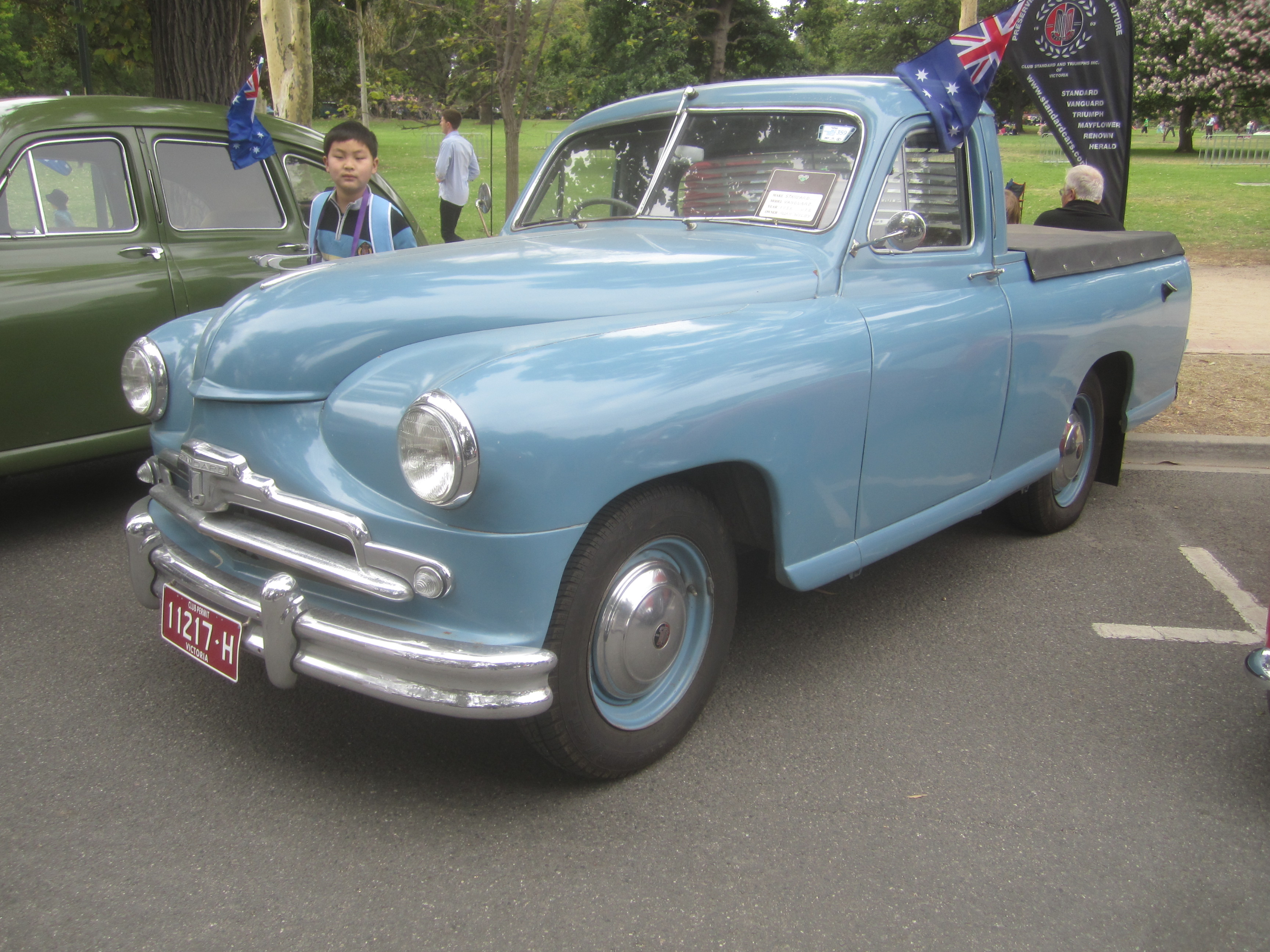
Standard Vanguard Phase II Utility

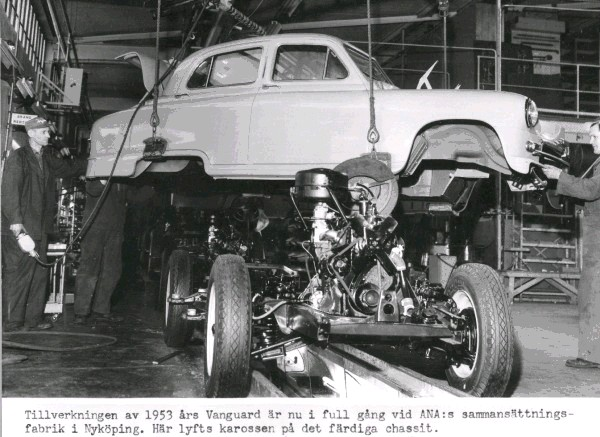
Assembly at AB Nyköpings Automobilfabrik in Sweden

== Vanguard Phase III & Vanguard Sportsman ==
Standard Vanguard Phase III Standard Vanguard Sportsman
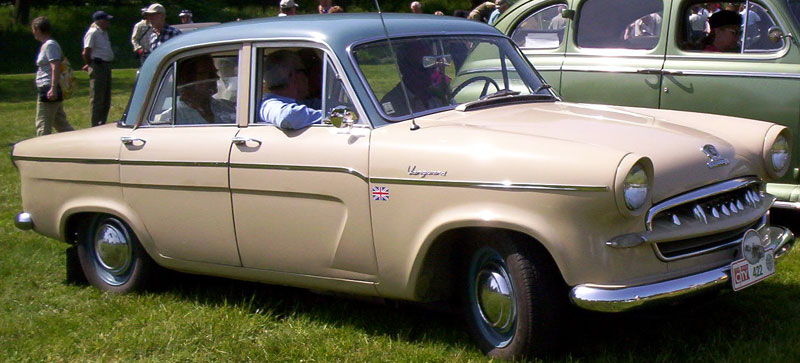
- Standard Vanguard Phase III Saloon

Overview
- Production: 1955–1958 (Phase III); 37,194 produced 1956–1957 (Sportsman); 901 produced

Body and chassis
- Body style: 4-door saloon; 5-door estate car; 2-door coupe utility (Australia)

Powertrain
- Engine: 2088 cc Standard I4
- Transmission: 4-speed manual Overdrive optional Automatic from 1957.

Dimensions
- Wheelbase: 102.5 in (2,604 mm)
- Length: 172 in (4,369 mm)
- Width: 67.5 in (1,714 mm)
- Height: 61.5 in (1,562 mm)

The Phase III, released to the market for the mid-October 1955 British International Motor Show, was a radical change with the elimination of the separate chassis. There was an overlap in availability of the old model with the Phase II estate continuing into 1956.

UK fuel was no longer restricted to the 72 octane "Pool petrol" of the 1940s and early 1950s, and with the modest increases in available octane levels, the Vanguard's compression ratio was increased to 7.0:1. The 2,088 cc (2.1 L) engine with its single Solex downdraught carburettor now produced 68 bhp (51 kW).

The front suspension was independent, using coil springs, and was bolted to a substantial sub-frame which also carried the recirculating ball steering gear. Semi-elliptic leaf springs were used on the rear axle. Lockheed hydraulic brakes with 9 in (229 mm) drums were fitted front and rear. The three-speed gearbox had a column change and the optional overdrive was operated by a switch on the steering column. A four-speed floor change became an option.

The new body was lower and had an increased glass area, making it look much more modern, and the old two-piece flat windscreen gave way to a one-piece curved design. The wheelbase increased by 8 in (203 mm), giving much better passenger accommodation. A heater was now a standard fitting. Bench seats were fitted in front and rear with folding centre arm rests. They were covered in Vynide, with leather available as an option.

The car was lighter than the superseded model, and the gearing was changed to deliver better economy with performance virtually unchanged.

A car with overdrive was tested by the British magazine The Motor in 1956. It had a top speed of 83.7 mph (134.7 km/h), could accelerate from 0–60 mph (97 km/h) in 21.7 seconds and had a fuel consumption of 25.9 miles per imperial gallon (10.9 L/100 km; 21.6 mpg_{‑US}). The test car cost £998 including taxes.

For 1957, the Australian-produced Phase III was given a facelift with a new mesh grille. In addition the saloon now sported fins on the rear guards.

=== Vanguard Sportsman ===
A performance model, the Vanguard Sportsman, intended to be badged as the Triumph Renown until shortly before launch, was announced in August 1956 with a tuned 90 bhp (67 kW) engine having similar features to the Triumph TR3 sports car. These included an increased compression ratio to 8.0:1, twin SU carburettors, and improved pistons. However, the Sportsman's inlet manifold and carburettors sat at a different angle from those of the TR3, and its engine had the same 85 mm bore as the Vanguard's, rather than the 83 mm bore of the TR3. The final-drive ratio was lowered to 4.55:1 to give better acceleration, and larger 10 in (254 mm) drums fitted to the brakes. The standard version had a bench front seat but separate seats were an option.

Although sharing the same basic body shell with the other Vanguard variations, the Sportsman had design variations, including a squarer front grille, which gave the car a slightly higher, squarer appearance than the standard models.

Just 901 examples of the Sportsman model were made up to 1958. Sportsmans then became available to special order, and around another fifty (mostly estate cars) were built between 1958 and 1960. A small number were built before the Vignale makeover in 1958. Popular Classics magazine's test of a Sportsman in 1994 stated that a total of 962 were built.

A Sportsman with overdrive was tested by The Motor in 1956 and it recorded a top speed of 90.7 mph (146 km/h), acceleration from 0–60 mph (97 km/h) in 19.2 seconds and a fuel consumption of 25.6 miles per imperial gallon (11.0 L/100 km; 21.3 mpg_{‑US}). The test car cost £1231 including taxes.

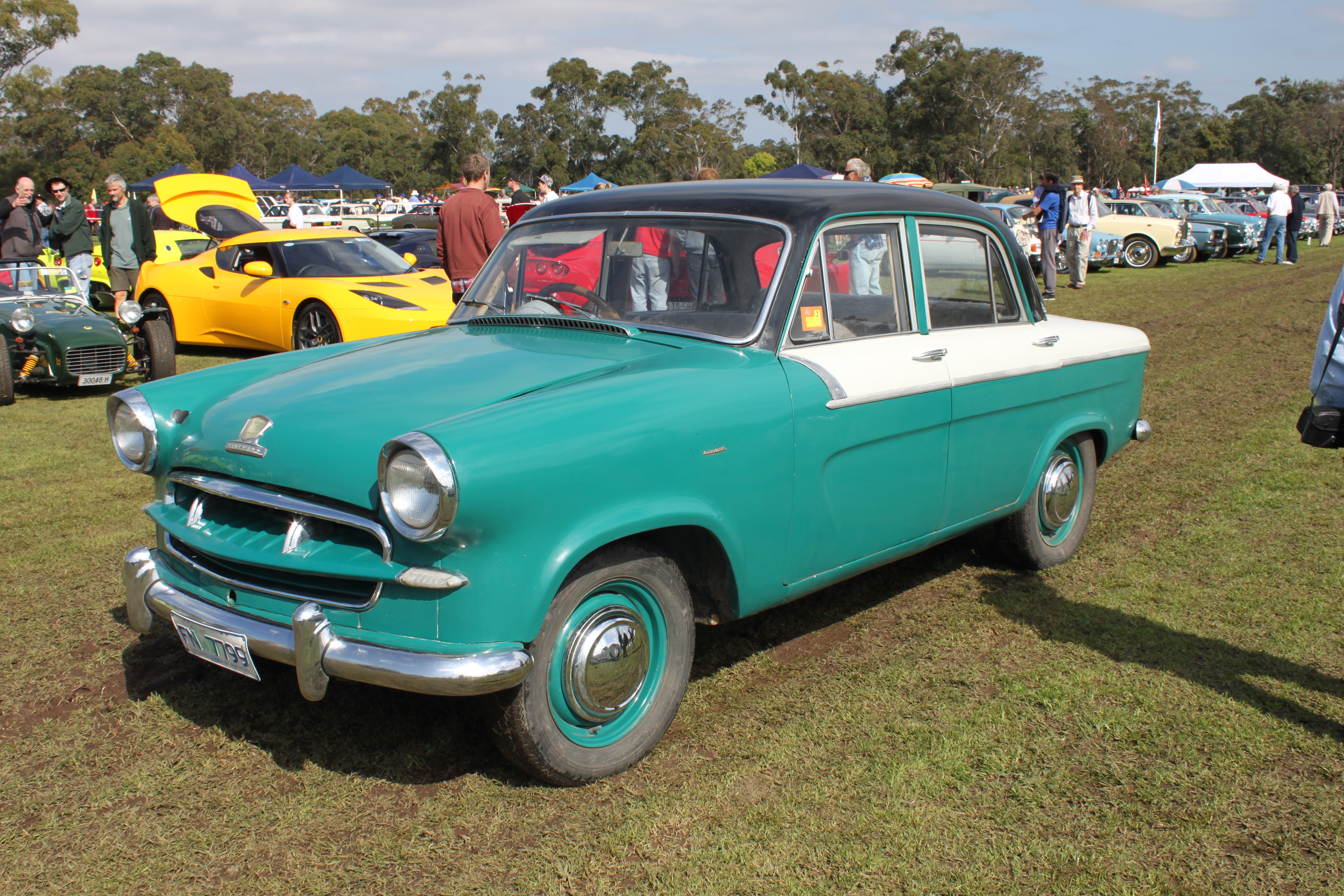
Standard Vanguard Phase III Saloon

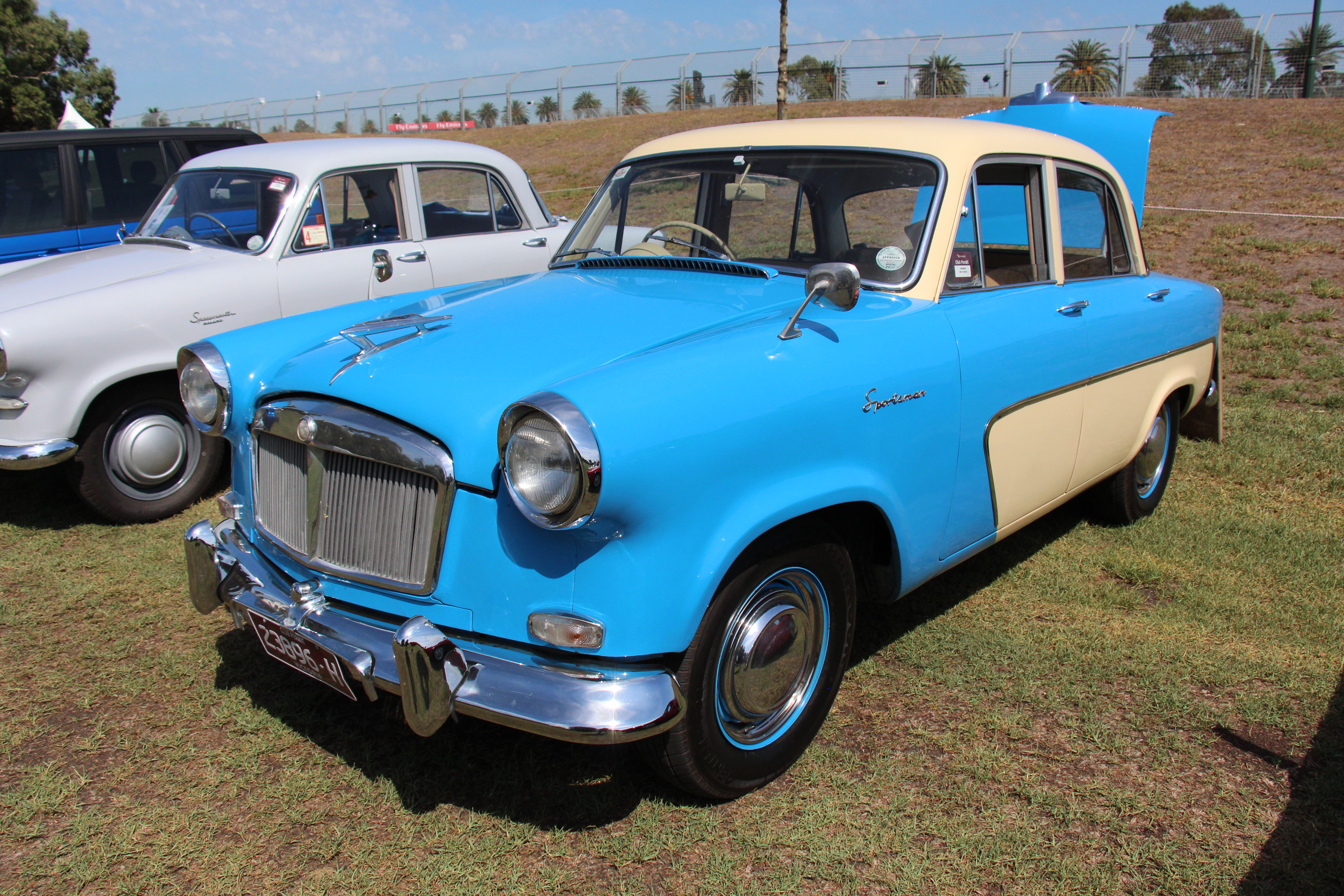
Standard Vanguard Sportsman

== Standard Ensign and Ensign De Luxe ==
Standard Ensign Standard Ensign De Luxe
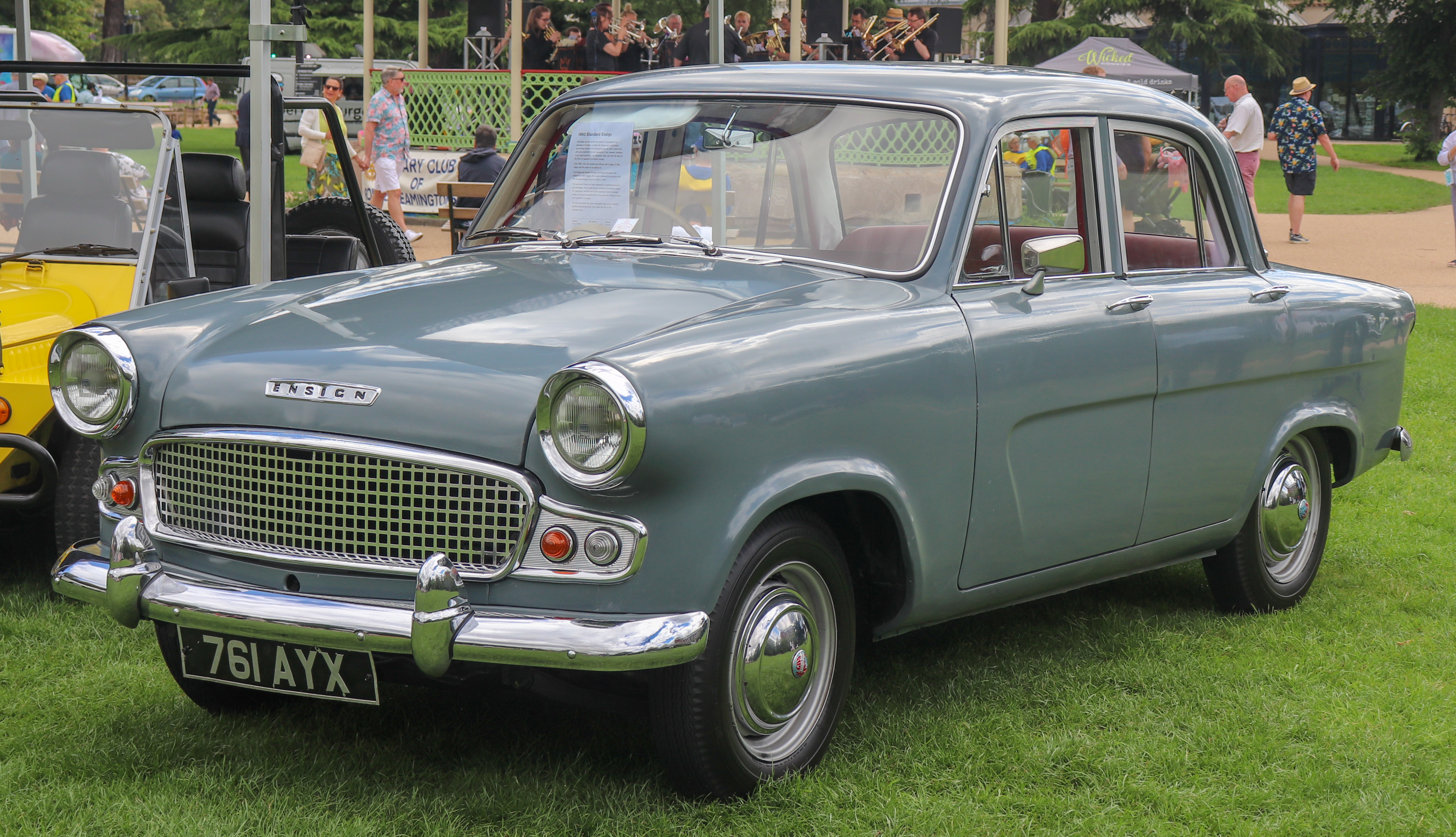
- 1960 Standard Ensign Saloon

Overview
- Production: 1957 to 1961 (Ensign); 18,852 produced 1962 to 1963 (Ensign De Luxe); 2,318 produced

Body and chassis
- Body style: 4 door saloon; 4 door estate car

Powertrain
- Engine: 1670 cc I4 (Ensign); 2138 cc I4 (Ensign De Luxe); 1622 cc Perkins P4C diesel I4
- Transmission: 4-speed manual

A basic model, the Standard Ensign, with 1670 cc engine, was announced in October 1957 restyled by Michelotti. The Ensign shared its body with the Vanguard Series III, but had a cheapened specification in various respects, including a mesh front grille and a simplified instrument panel and dashboard. Despite the generally lower specification, the Ensign was the first Vanguard-based car to have a four-speed gearbox. The gear lever was moved from the column to the floor, and overdrive was optional. Many were bought for company fleets and for the armed forces. Production ceased in 1961 with 18,852 examples having been produced. Production included 901 Mk II versions, produced only in 1961.

An Ensign De Luxe version followed in 1962 and 1963 with a larger 2138 cc engine. Unlike the smaller-engined original version, the De Luxe was also available as an estate car.

A 1670 cc Ensign was tested by the British magazine The Motor in 1958. It recorded a top speed of 77.6 mph (124.9 km/h), acceleration from 0–60 mph (97 km/h) in 24.4 seconds and a fuel consumption of 28.5 miles per imperial gallon (9.9 L/100 km; 23.7 mpg_{‑US}). The test car cost £899 including taxes of £300.

In January 1960 a diesel engined Ensign was announced, featuring the compact "P4C" 1.6 litre four-cylinder engine produced by specialists Perkins of Peterborough. Claimed output was 43 bhp (32 kW), with fuel consumption stated as "about 50 mpg" (5.6 L/100 km; 42 mpg-US).

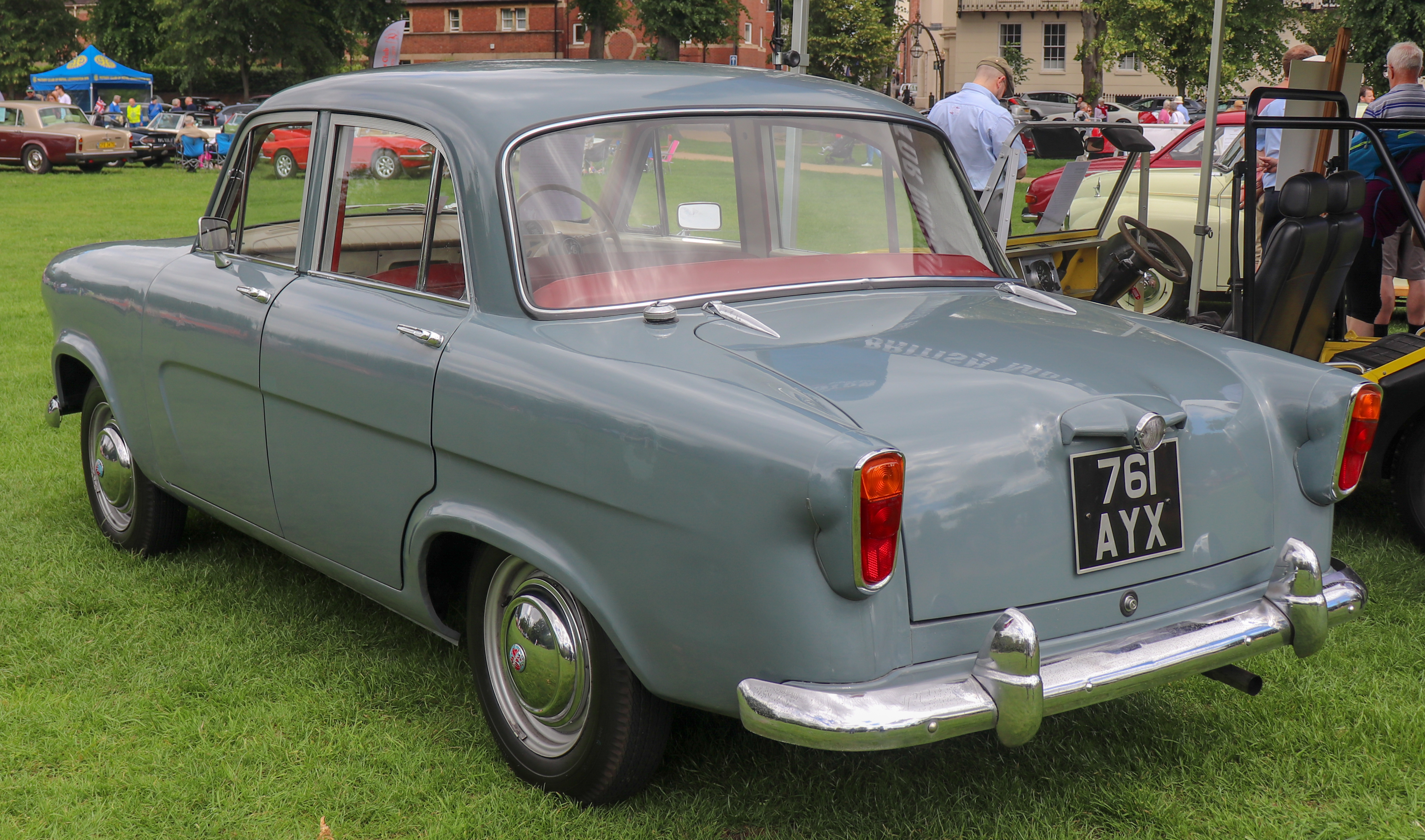
Rear view

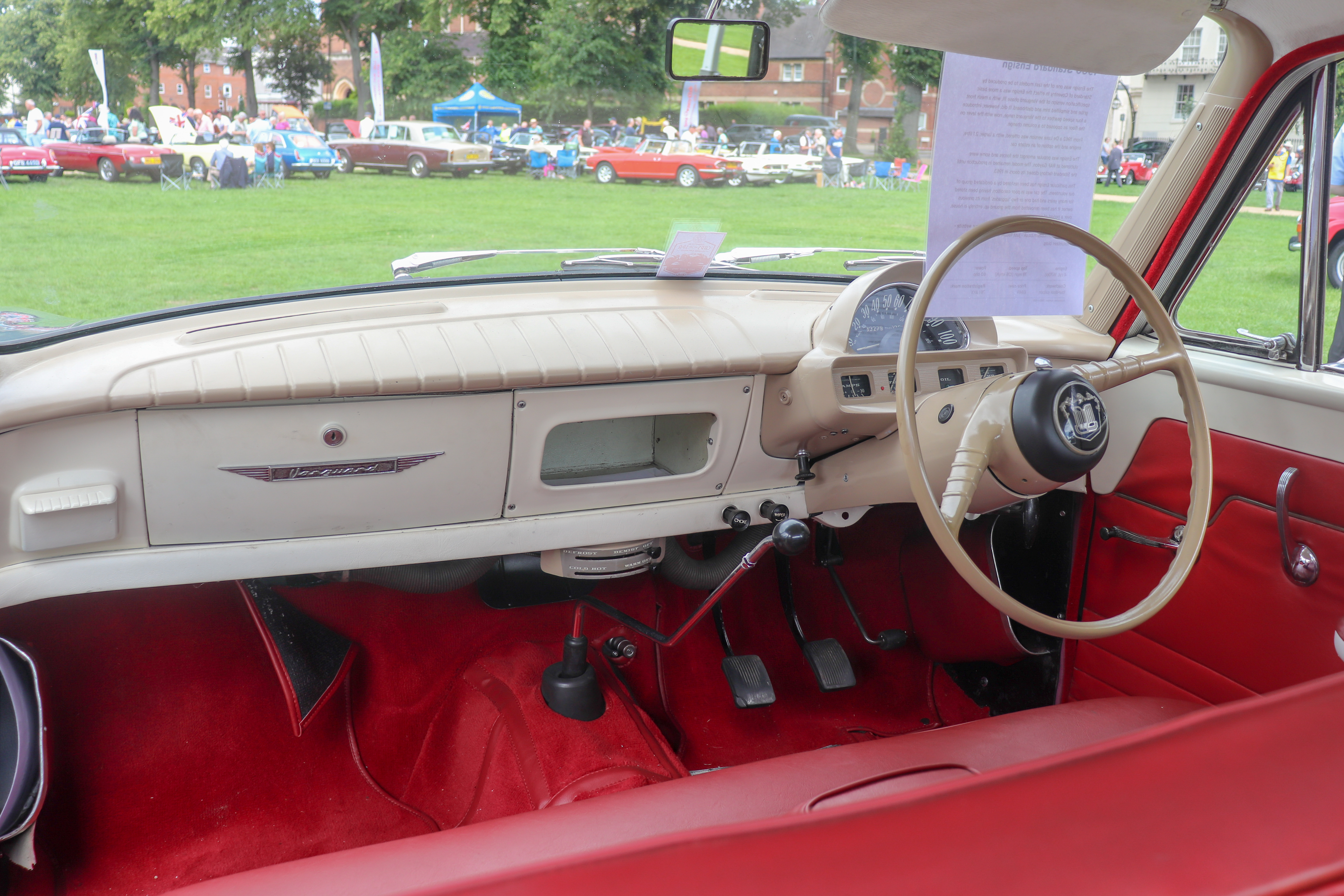
Interior

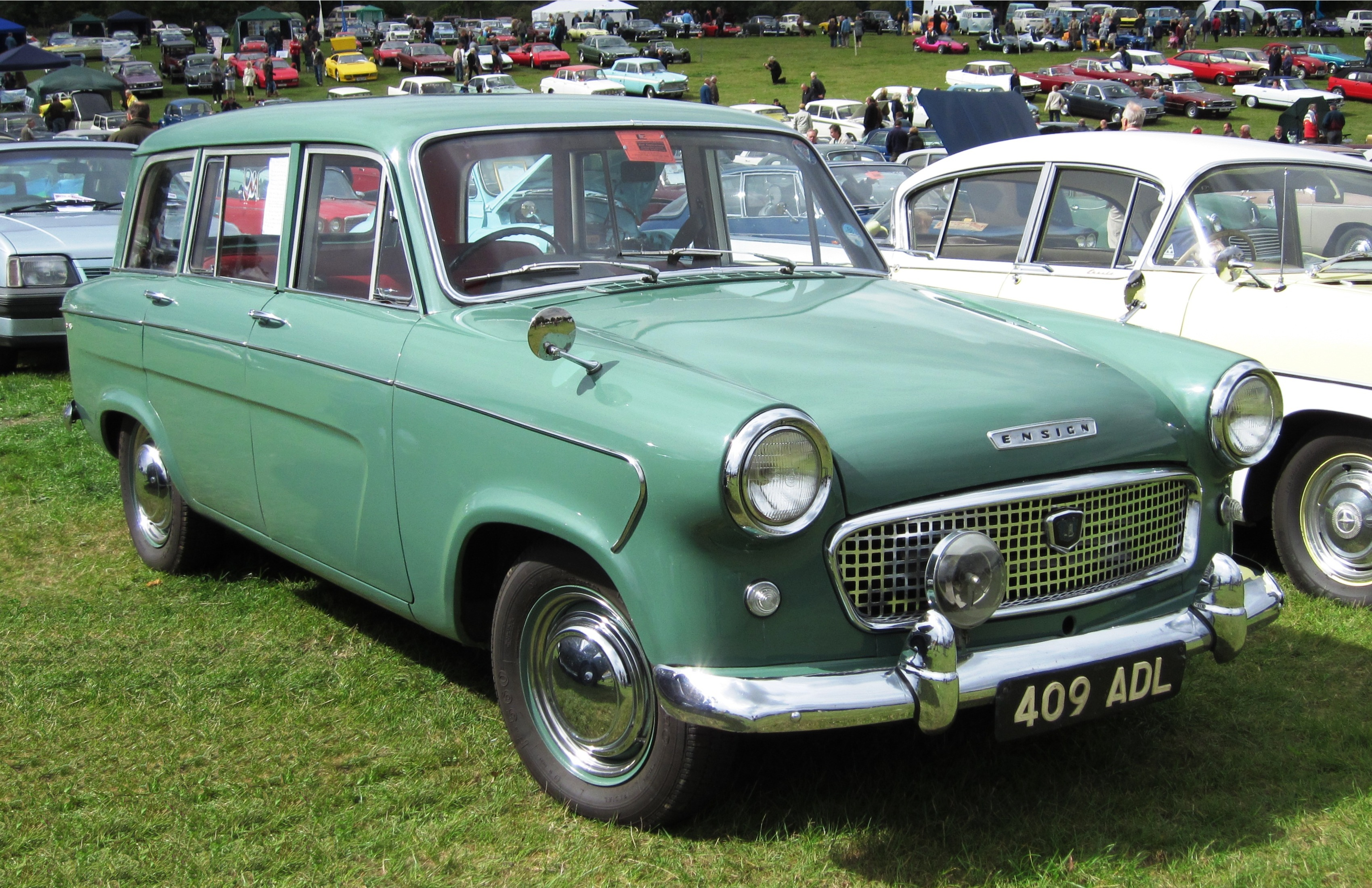
Standard Ensign Estate

== Vanguard Vignale ==
Standard Vanguard Vignale
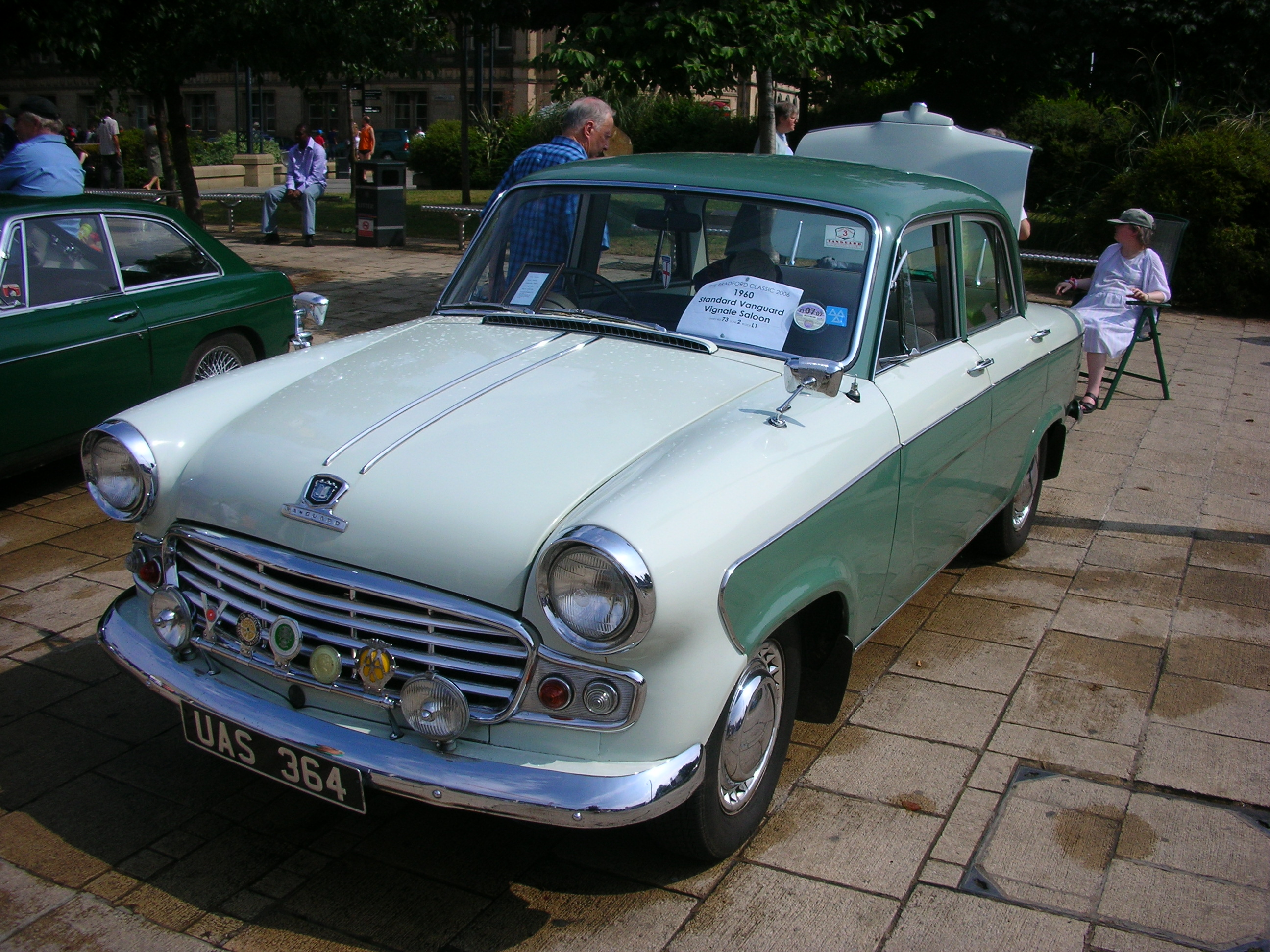

Overview
- Production: 1958–1961; 26,267 made
- Designer: Giovanni Michelotti

Body and chassis
- Body style: 4 door saloon; 4 door estate car; 2 door coupe utility; 2 door panel van

Powertrain
- Engine: 2088 cc I4
- Transmission: 4-speed manual Overdrive optional automatic

Dimensions
- Wheelbase: 102 in (2,591 mm)
- Length: 172 in (4,369 mm)
- Width: 68.5 in (1,740 mm)
- Height: 60 in (1,524 mm)

A face-lift of the Phase III was designed by Italian stylist Giovanni Michelotti and coach-builders Vignale in 1958, and was introduced at the October 1958 Earls Court Motor Show. The windscreen and rear window were deeper, and there was a revised grille and trim. A floor change four-speed manual gearbox was now fitted, and the provision of a three-speed gear box with column change offered as an option. An overdrive was also offered an option, as was an automatic. One automatic car is known to have survived - there may be others.

The car had front and rear bench seats, which were covered, as standard, in Vynide. Leather was an option on the home market and cloth for exported models. A heater and (unusual for the time) electric windscreen washers were factory fitted, although a radio remained an option.

A Vignale with overdrive was tested by the British magazine The Motor in 1959. It recorded a top speed of 82.8 mph (133.3 km/h), acceleration from 0–60 mph (97 km/h) in 20.8 seconds and a fuel consumption of 28.0 miles per imperial gallon (10.1 L/100 km; 23.3 mpg_{‑US}). The test car cost £1147 including taxes of £383.

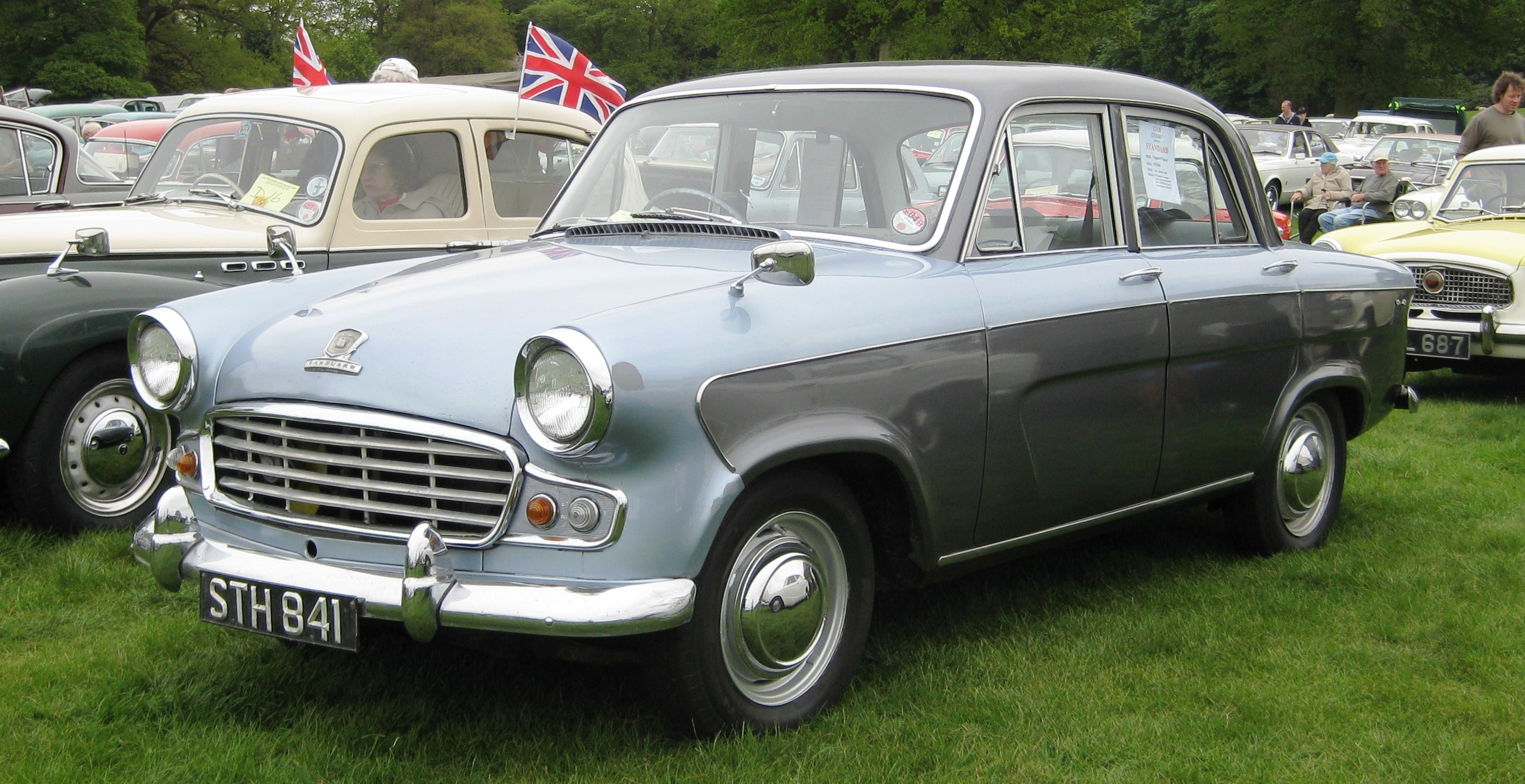
Standard Vanguard Vignale Saloon

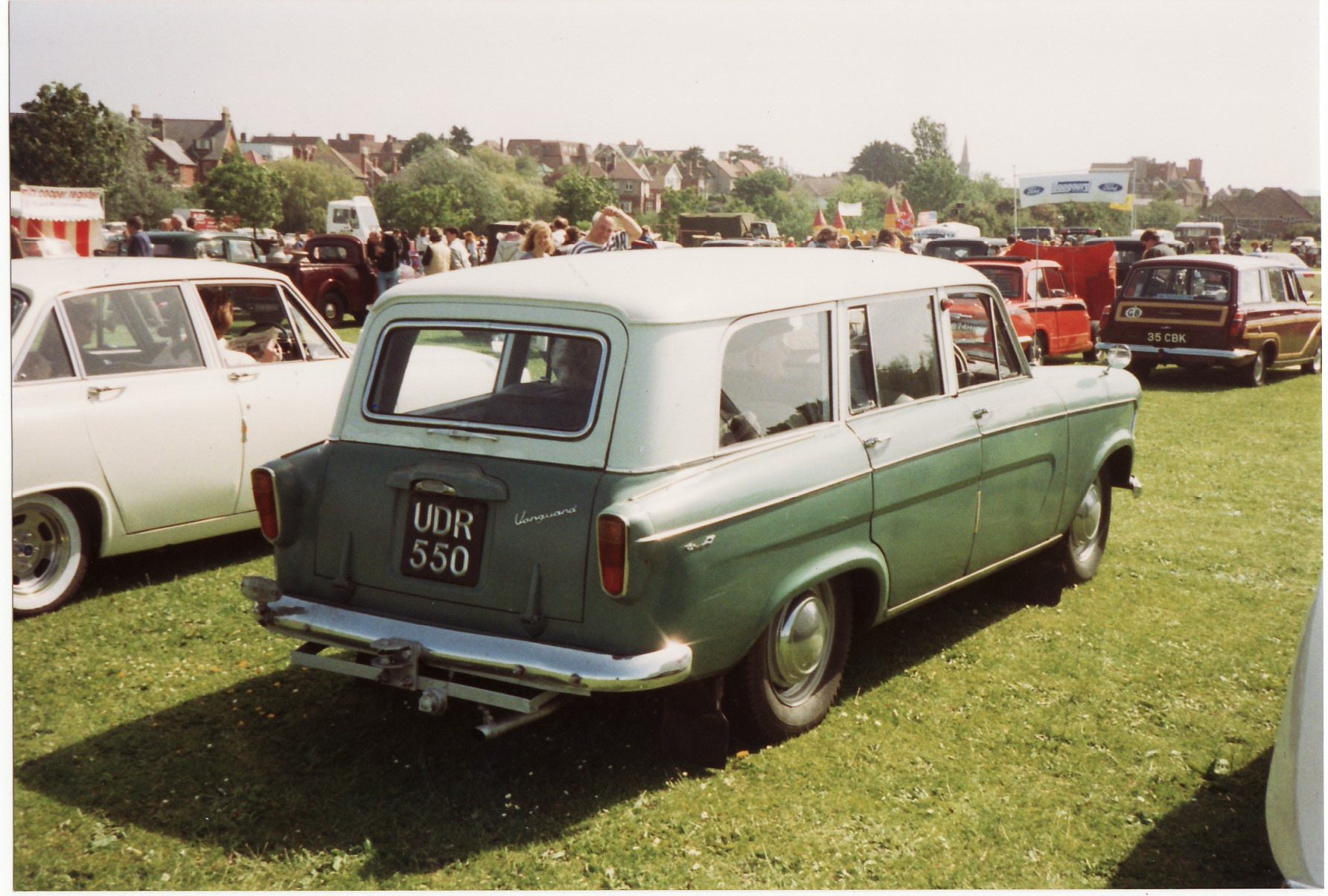
Standard Vanguard Vignale Estate

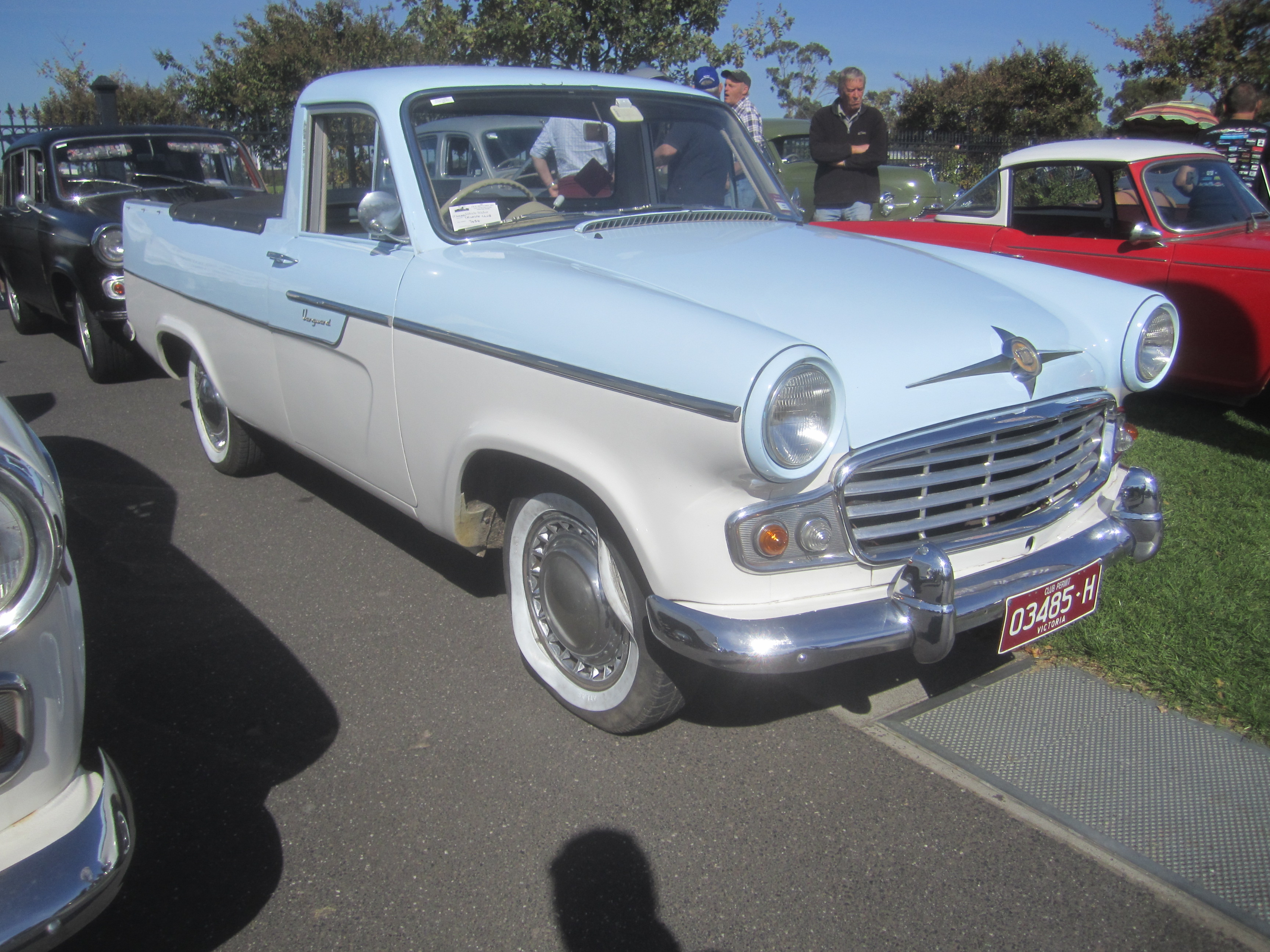
Standard Vanguard Vignale Utility

== Vanguard Six ==
Standard Vanguard Six
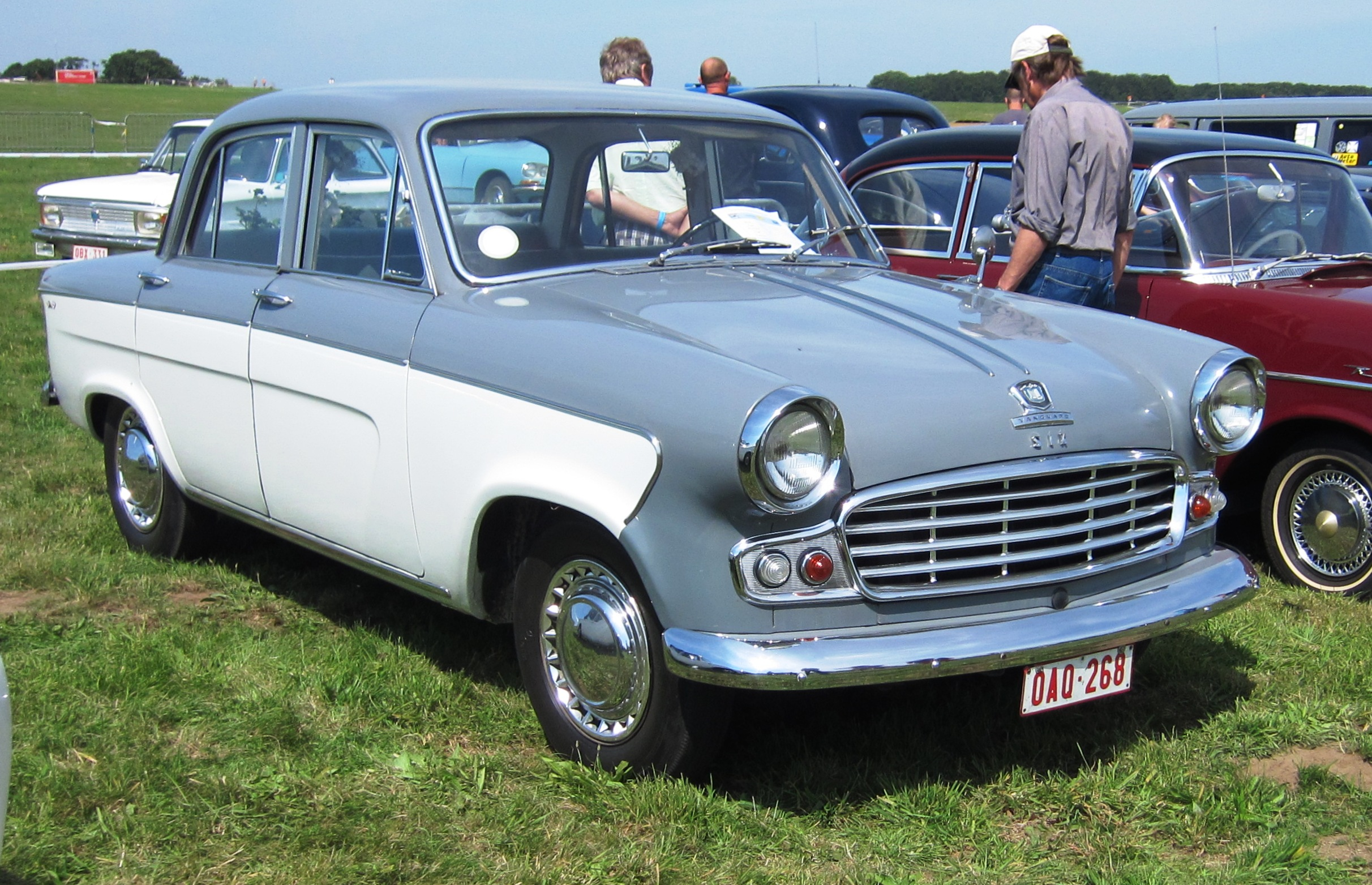

Overview
- Production: 1960–1963; 9953 made
- Designer: Giovanni Michelotti

Body and chassis
- Body style: 4-door saloon; 5-door estate car; 2-door coupe utility (Australia); 2-door van (Australia)

Powertrain
- Engine: 1998 cc Triumph "Six" I6
- Transmission: Three or four-speed manual Overdrive optional automatic

Dimensions
- Wheelbase: 102 in (2,591 mm)
- Length: 172 in (4,369 mm); 173.5 in (4,407 mm) (Estate)
- Width: 67.5 in (1,714 mm)
- Height: 60 in (1,524 mm)

Introduced at the end of 1960, the last of the Vanguards featured a six-cylinder 1,998 cc engine with push-rod overhead valves: this was the engine subsequently installed in the Triumph 2000. The compression ratio was 8.0:1, and twin Solex carburettors were fitted giving an output of 80 bhp (60 kW) at 4500 rpm. Externally the only differences from the Vignale were the badging but the interior was updated.

Australian production included coupe utility and van variants. Early in the model run the rear lights of the coupe utility were changed from a vertical to a horizontal layout with a different rear body side panel.

A Vanguard Six was tested by the British magazine The Motor in 1960. It recorded a top speed of 87.2 mph (140.3 km/h), acceleration from 0–60 mph (97 km/h) in 17.0 seconds and a fuel consumption of 24.9 miles per imperial gallon (11.3 L/100 km; 20.7 mpg_{‑US}). The test car cost £1021 including taxes of £301.

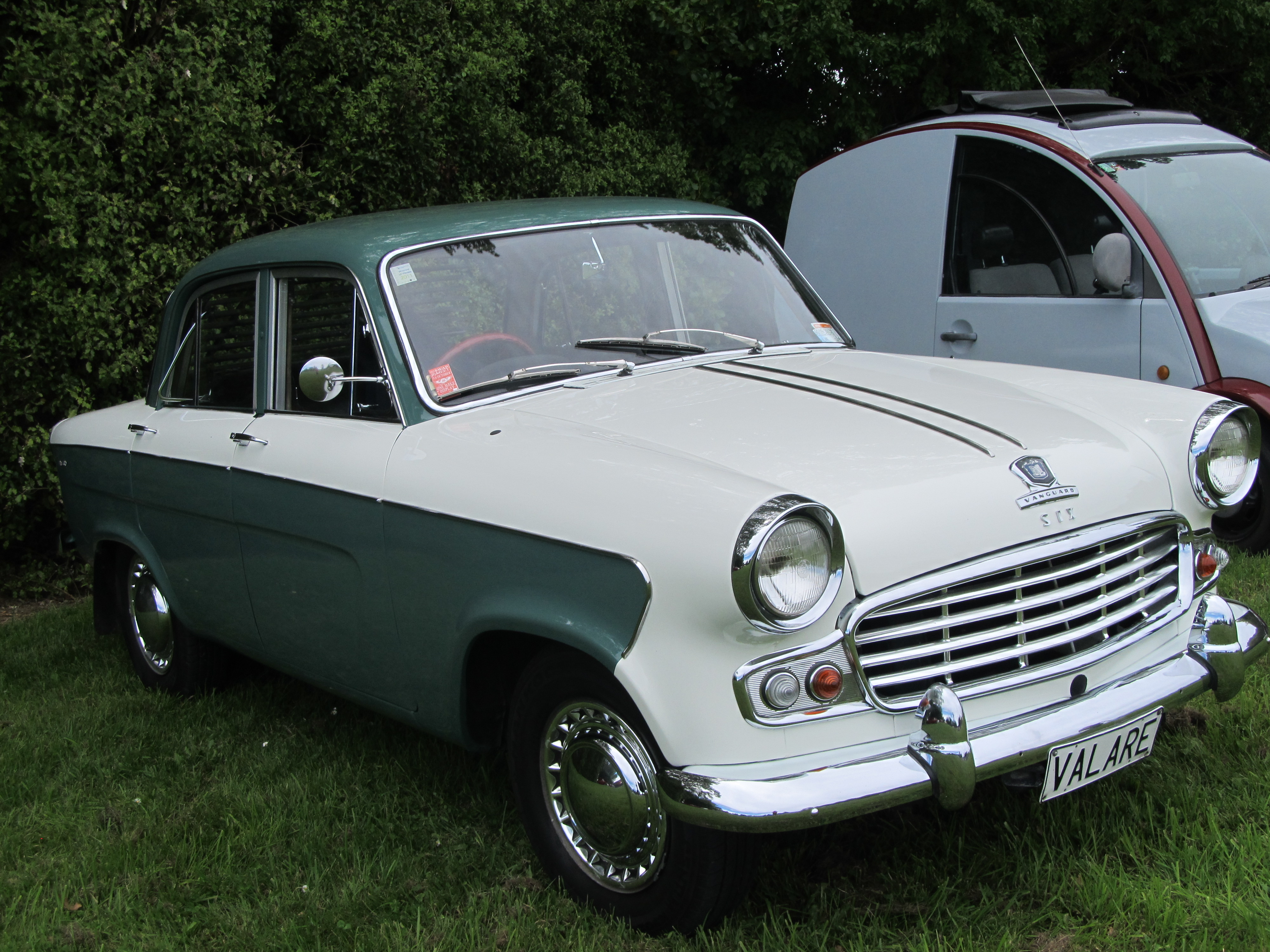
Standard Vanguard Six Saloon

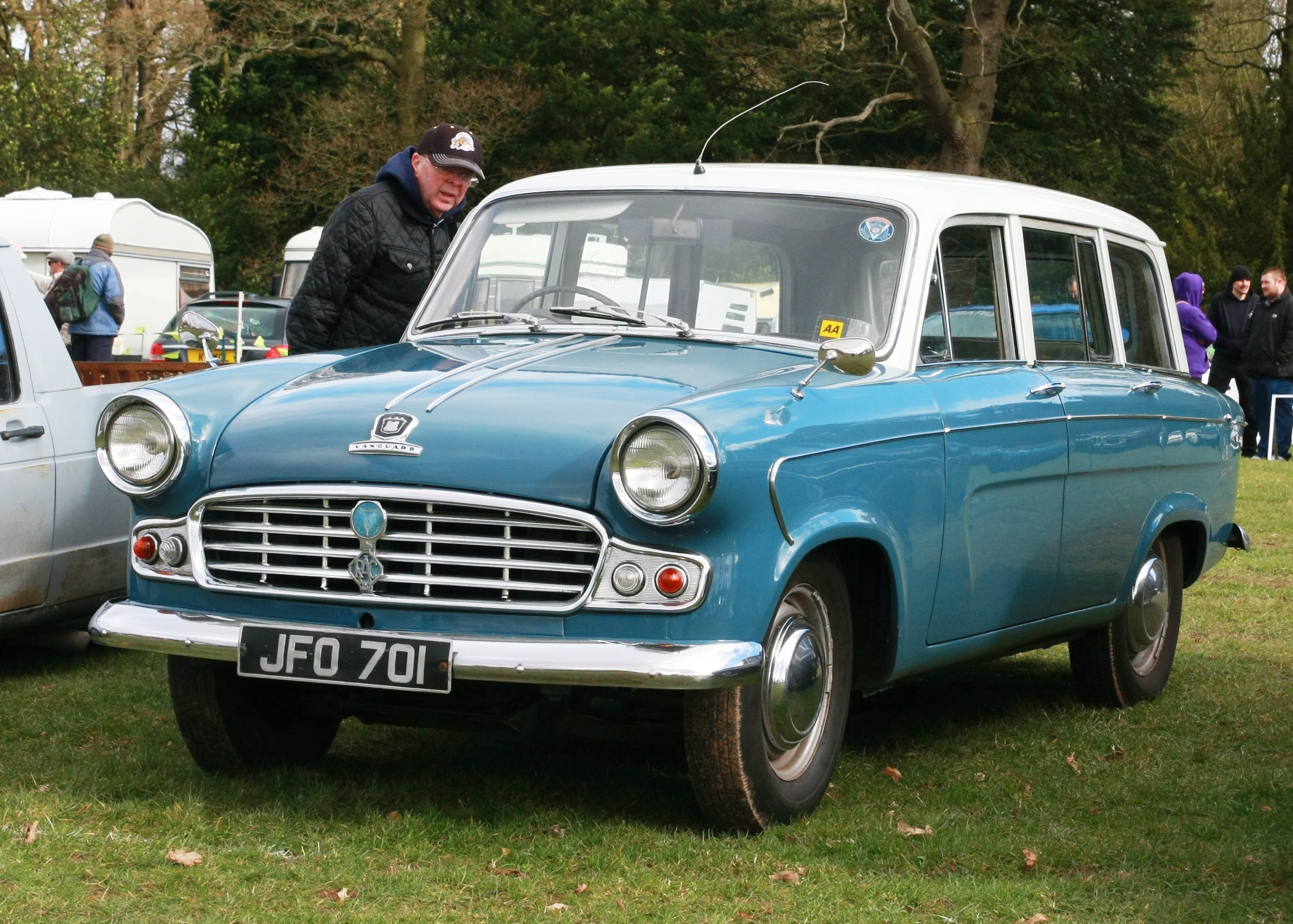
Standard Vanguard Six Estate

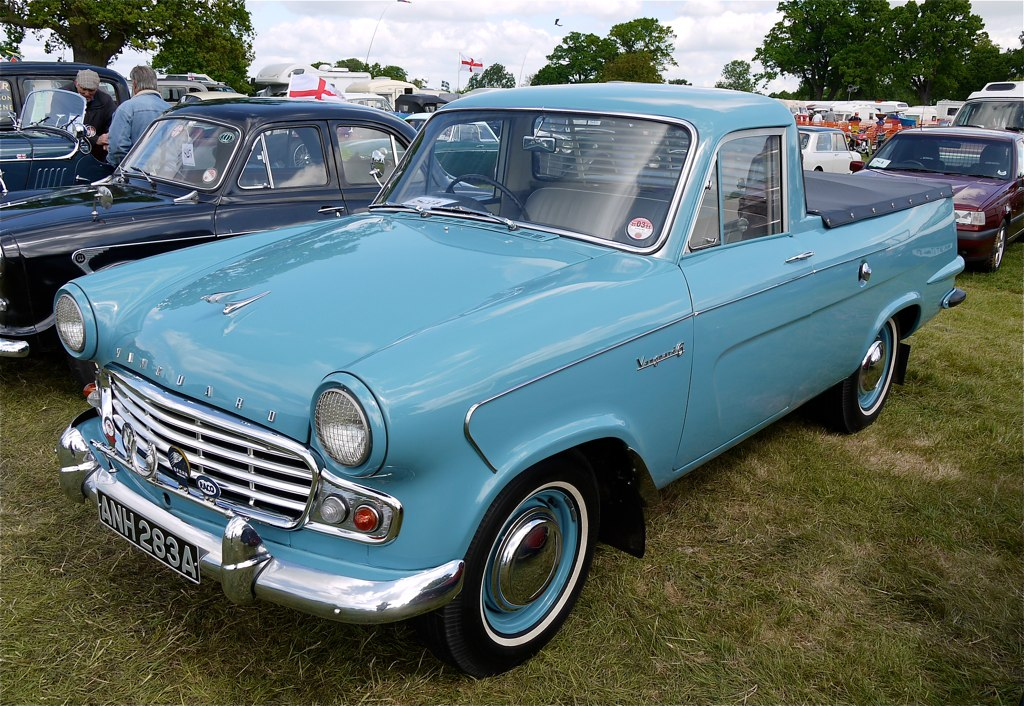
Standard Vanguard Six Utility (later version with horizontal rear lights)

== Replacement and end of Standard ==
Leyland Motors took over Standard-Triumph in 1960 and the prototype Triumph 2000 progressed with new money, the engine being used by the Vanguard Six from 1961 to early 1963. The six was lighter than the old four and was a development based on the Standard Ten unit.

Both the Ensign and the Vanguard were replaced in 1963 by the Triumph 2000, and the Standard name disappeared from the British market after 60 years.

== Vanguard Utility ==
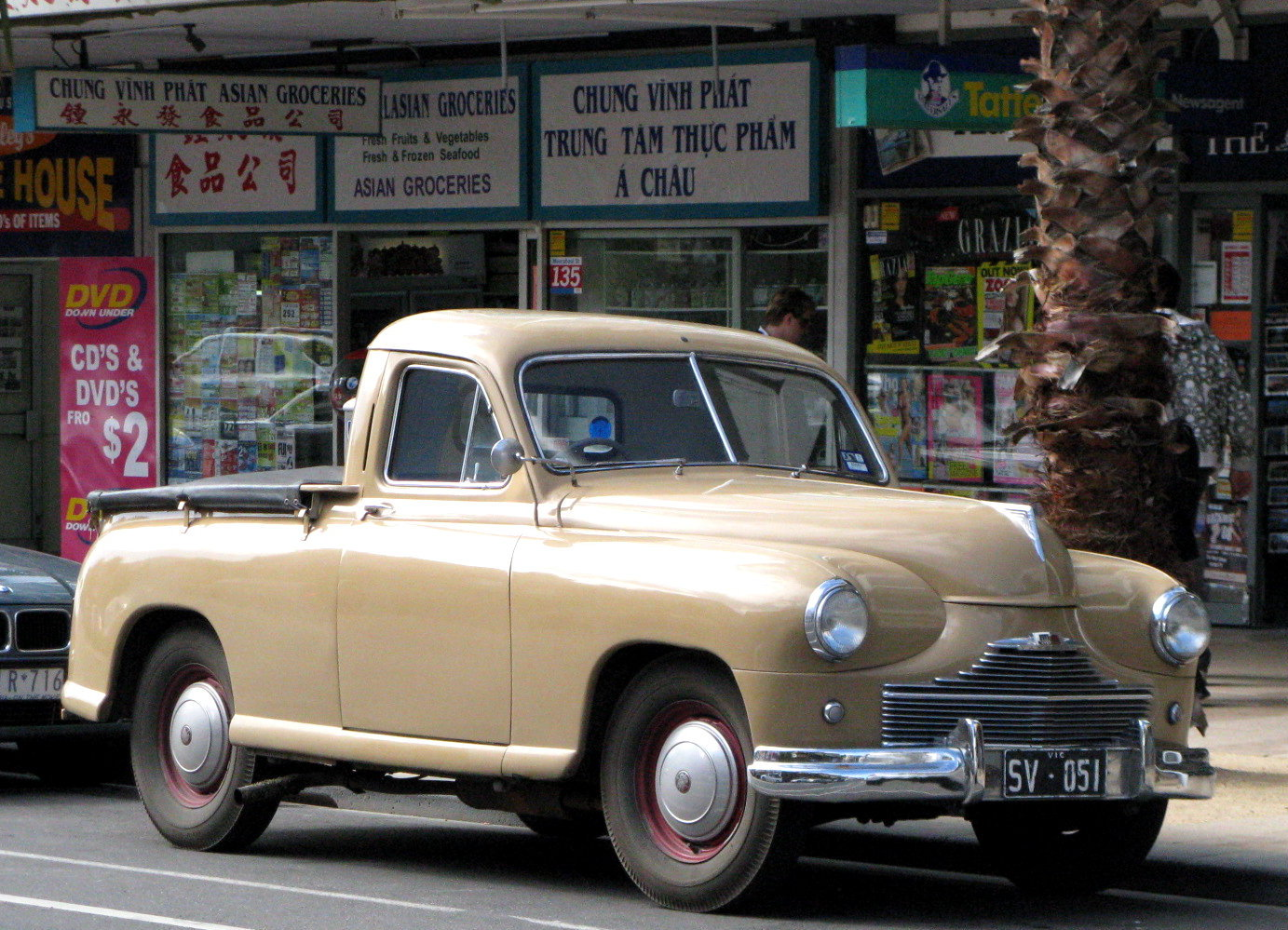
Standard Vanguard I Ute 1948-1952

In 1950, the Australian subsidiary of the Standard Motor Company introduced a coupé utility version of the Vanguard Phase I. It was fitted with the same 2088 cc four-cylinder engine as used in the saloon. Utility versions of the Vanguard were produced in Australia over the following years, with production ending in 1964.

The Vanguard Utility was sold in the UK as a pickup truck. The main purchaser was the Royal Air Force, which had them in Phase I and II form. The Phase II commercials remained available until 1958, when they were replaced by the Phase 3. Around 50 phase 3 pickups went to Welsh Water and the workshop manual pictures a pickup with a body by Awson. A gown van and a breakdown tender are shown in the brochure.

Sales in the UK were modest, mostly due to stiff competition from the British Motor Corporation and from Standard's other commercial vehicles including the 5 cwt and later 7 cwt vehicles. With the discontinuation of the Vanguard Utility, the only commercial vehicle produced by the company was the Standard Atlas, and so that was the Vanguard Utility's replacement, but they did share some common parts.

== Die-cast models ==
- Dinky Toys made a model of the Phase I.
- Corgi Toys included a model of the Phase III saloon in their range from 1957 to 1961 as model No 207. Additionally, a Phase III saloon presented as a Royal Air Force Staff Car was available from 1958 to 1962 as model No 352.
