= 1935 Centenary 300 =

The 1935 Centenary 300 was a motor race staged at the Phillip Island circuit in Victoria, Australia on 1 January 1935. It was contested over 46 laps of the 6.569 mile course, a total distance of 302.174 miles. At the time, it was claimed to be the longest race of the kind ever held in Australia. The race, which was conducted on a handicap basis, was limited to cars with a piston displacement of not more than 2500cc. The race meeting was organised by the Light Car Club of Australia and was held under licence from the Australian Automobile Association and in accordance with the International Sporting Code governing car racing.

The race was won by Les Murphy driving an MG P.

== Results ==
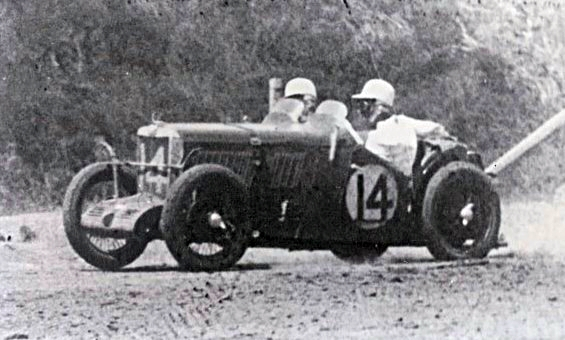
Bernie Horsley contested the race driving an MG J3

Position	Driver	Car	No.	Acceptor	Handicap	Time	Speed (mph)	Laps
1	Les Murphy	MG P-type		L. Murphy	53m 40s	4h 32m 51s	66.44	46
2	W. Williamson	Riley Imp		Cohen and Cameron	19m 56s	4h 8m 56s	72.83	46
3	Les Jennings	MG Magna		L. Jennings	31m 26s	4h 21m 39s	69.307	46
4	Lyster Jackson	Singer Le Mans		L.G. Jackson	59m 48s	4m 55s 38s	61.32	46
FO	Norman Putt	Singer Le Mans		N.F. Putt	59m 48s			
FO	Cec Warren	MG Q s/c		C.R. Warren	4m 35s			
FO	R. McKay	MG P-type		R. McKay	53m 40s			
FO	J.E. Norman	Ballot 2 Litre		J.E. Norman	31m 26s			
DNF	R. Burton	MG Magnette Type N		R. Burton	32m 12s			
DNF	E. Nichols	Bugatti 2 litre		E. Nichols	38m 20s			
DNF	Len Terry	Bugatti Type 30	19	L. Terry	56m 48s			
DNF	Mert Wreford	Riley Brooklands		G. Cohen	52m 8s			39
DNF	Jack McCutcheon	Bugatti Type 37		K. Macmeikan	27m 35s			36
DNF	A.J. Terdich	Bugatti Type 37 s/c		A.J. Terdich	17m 38s			31
DNF	Bob Lea-Wright	Singer Le Mans	26	R.A. Lea-Wright	55m 58s			
DNF	Campbell Graham	MG P-type	25	C. Graham	53m 40s			24
DNF	V.A. Maloney	MG Magna		V.A. Maloney	44m 28s			17
DNF	H. Drake-Richmond	Bugatti Type 37	15	H. Drake-Richmond	35m 16s			15
DNF	Bill Thompson	MG K3 Magnette	1	R.T. Lane	4m 35s			10
DNF	Bernie Horsley	MG J3 s/c	14	J.L. & W.B. Horsley	32m 58s			
DNF	R.G. Watson	Wolseley Special Sports		Kellow-Falkinar Pty Ltd	52m 8s			0
DNS	E. Summerfield	Morris Special		E. Summerfield	63m 28s			
DNS	E.J. Buckley	Kirby Deering Special		E.J. Buckley	Scratch			
DNS	W.H. Galpin	Riley Brooklands	6	W.H. Cameron	25m 18s			
DNS	J.W. Fraser	Bugatti Monza		H.W. Edwards	26m 50s			
DNS	O.B. Last	MG J3 s/c		O.B. Last	32m 58s			
DNS	R. Kent	MG P		M. Maxwell	38m 20s			
DNS	W. Barton	Lombard		W. Barton	48m 15s			

=== Notes ===
- Entries: 28
- Starters: 21
- Non-starters: 7
- Finishers (within five hour time limit): 4
- Flagged Off (exceeded five hour time limit): 4
- Attendance: 20,000
- Fastest time: W Williamson, 4h 8m 56s
- Fastest lap: Bill Thompson, MG Magnette, 4:48.6

The car driven by Campbell Graham crashed on the 34th lap of the race. Both Graham and his riding mechanic John Peters died as a result of their injuries.
