= 1937 Phillip Island Trophy =

The 1937 Phillip Island Trophy was a motor race held at the then-new 3.3 mile Phillip Island "triangular" circuit, in Victoria, Australia on 15 March 1937. It was contested over 45 laps, a distance of 150 miles. Organised by the Victorian Sporting Car Club, it was staged on a handicap basis with the limit starter commencing the race 30 minutes before the scratch starter.

The race was won by Bob Lea-Wright driving a Terraplane Special. Lea-Wright also set the fastest race time, for which he was awarded the Jack Manton Trophy.

== Results ==
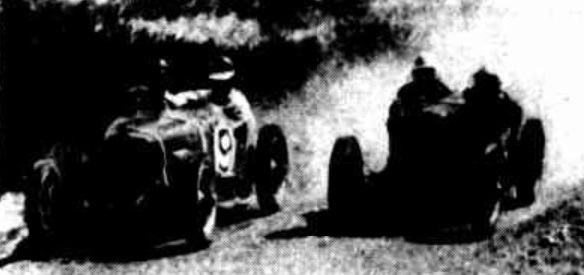
The No.9 Riley Imp of Merton Wreford passes the MG P Type of H. Reeve during the race

Position	Driver	No.	Car	Entrant	Handicap	Race Time	Laps
1	Bob Lea-Wright	6	Terraplane Special		11m 15s	2h 16m 06s	45
2	A. Barrett	21	Morris Cowley Special		25m 30s	2h 33m 12s	45
3	Les Murphy	17	MG P		23m 15s	2h 32m 38s	45
4	A. Beasley	18	MG P	D. Sowter	23m 15s	2h 37m 36s	45
5	Les Burrows	4	Hudson Eight Special		03m 45s	2h 17m 42s	45
6	J. O'Dea	15	MG P		23m 15s	2h 37m 28s	45
7	Merton Wreford	9	Riley Imp	D. Watkins	19m 30s	2h 35m 49s	45
8	G.C. Martin	12	Bugatti Type 37	L. Stone	22m 30s	2h 42m 56s	45
9	Lyster Jackson	1	MG K3 s/c		00m 00s	2h 21m 46s	45
10	Hugh Syme	10	MG J3		30m 00s	2h 52m 23s	45
DNF	J. Gullan	22	Wolseley Special		25m 30s		44
DNF	J. Summers	14	MG Magna		22m 30s		43
DNF	Jack Phillips	5	Ford V8 Special		09m 00s		34
DNF	H. Reeve	16	MG P		23m 15s		27
DNF	Hope Bartlett	2	MG Q s/c		01m 30s		23
DNF	C.G. Williamson	8	Chrysler Special		12m 00s		21
DNF	R. Head	19	Riley		24m 00s		21
DNF	H. Beith	7	Terraplane Special		11m 15s		14
DNF	H. Abbott	11	Austin Seven Special s/c		21m 00s		3
DNS	A. Aitkin		Riley Brooklands		24m 00s		-
DNA	John Snow		MG K3		00m 00s		-

=== Notes ===
- Race distance: 45 laps, 150 miles
- Format: Handicap start (Limit starter commenced 30 minutes before scratch starter)
- Limit starter: H.R Syme (MG J3) (Syme was to start his supercharged MG off 21 minutes but pre-race mechanical problems resulted in him starting, without the supercharger fitted, from a revised handicap of 30 minutes.)
- Scratch starter: Lyster Jackson (MG K3)
- Starters: 19
- Classified finishers: 10
- Fastest Time: R.A. Lea-Wright (Terraplane), 2h 16m 6s
- Average speed of winning car: Approximately 66.1 mph
