= 1934 Winter 100 =

Motor race

The 1934 Winter 100 was a motor race held at the Phillip Island circuit, near Cowes on Phillip Island, in Victoria, Australia on 4 June 1934. The race, which was organised by the Light Car Club of Australia, was staged over 15 laps, a total distance of 100 miles. It was contested on a handicap basis with the first car scheduled to start 17 minutes 30 seconds before the Scratch car.

The race was won by Les Jennings driving an MG Magna from a handicap of 10 minutes 45 seconds.

== Results ==
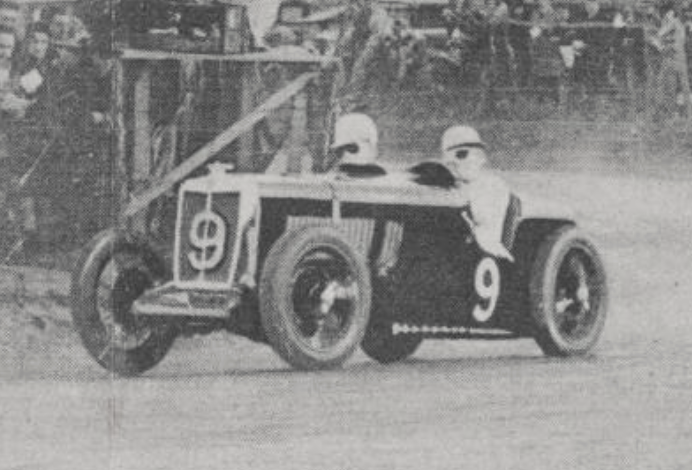
The winning MG Magna of Les Jennings contesting the 1934 Winter 100

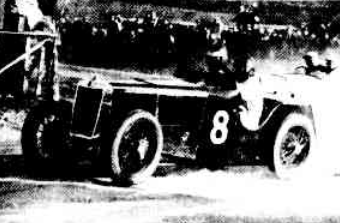
The MG Magna of Hope Bartlett contesting the 1934 Winter 100

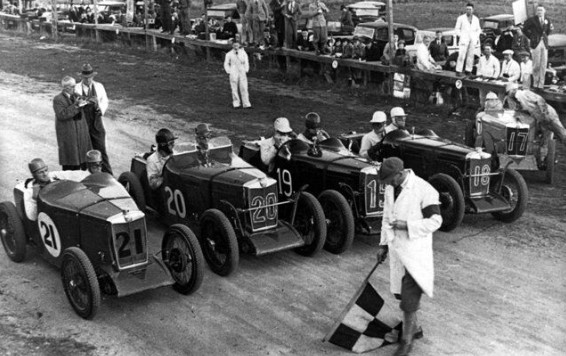
The second starting group in the 1934 Winter 100. The starters are the #21 MG J2 of Les Murphy, the #20 MG J2 of Jack Clements, the #19 MG J2 of Jim Skinner and the #18 MG J2 of Colin Keefer. The #17 MG J2 of Arthur Terdich is at the side of the track.

Position	Driver	No.	Car	Entrant	Handicap	Laps	Time
1	Les Jennings	9	MG Magna	L. Jennings	10m 45s	15	1h 20m 46s
2	Bob Lea Wright	22	Singer Le Mans	A. Beasley	17m 30s	15	1h 28m 19s
3	Jack Clements	20	MG J2	Britannia Motors	15m 00s	15	1h 28m 37s
4	Jim Skinner	19	MG J2	Britannia Motors	15m 00s	15	1h 28m 49s
5	John Summers	11	MG Magna	J. H. Summers	10m 45s	15	1h 26m 30s
6	Colin Keefer	18	MG J2	Britannia Motors	15m 00s	15	1h 33m 16s
7	Bill Thompson	14	MG P	R. T. Lane	13m 00s	15	1h 34m 10s
FO	Les Murphy	21	MG J2	L. Murphy	15m 00s	14	1h 39m 33s
DNF	Hope Bartlett	8	MG Magna	Britannia Motors	10m 45s	6	
DNF	Ted McLean	16	Salmson	E. McLean	14m 30s	6	
DNF	R. Allen	12	MG Magna	R. Allen	12m 30s	5	
DNF	Harry Drake-Richmond	7	Bugatti Type 37	H. Drake-Richmond	10m 30s	4	
DNF	Ken McKinney	2	MG J3 s/c	Britannia Motors	7m 30s	4	
DNF	Ron Head		Riley Brooklands	W. E. Johnson	13m 45s	1	
DNF	Arthur Terdich	17	MG J2	Britannia Motors	14m 30s	0	
DNS	V. A. Moloney		MG Magna	V. A. Moloney	10m 45s	-	
DNS	Jack McCutcheon		Bugatti Type 37	K MacKelkan	8m 45s	-	
DNS	Jack Williamson		MG J3 s/c	C. J. W. Williamson	7m 30s	-	
DNS	Bill Thompson		MG K3 Magnette s/c	R. T. Lane	Scratch	-	
DNA	Bill Lowe		Lombard s/c	W. H. Lowe	10m 30s	-	
DNA	Merton Wreford		MG J3	S. C. M. Wreford	7m 30s	-	

=== Legend ===
- FO = Flagged Off
- DNF = Did Not Finish
- DNS = Did Not Start
- DNA = Did Not Arrive

=== Notes ===
- Entries: 21
- Starters: 15
- Finishers: 7
- Winner's average speed: 74.2 mph
- Fastest Time: L. Jennings (MG Magna): 1h 20m 46s
- Fastest Lap: L. Jennings (MG Magna): 5m 20s
- Leggetts Teams Cup: Britannia Motors (Jack Clements, Jim Skinner & Colin Keefer)
