= 1934 Victorian Centenary Grand Prix =

The Victorian Centenary Grand Prix was a motor race staged at the Phillip Island circuit in Victoria, Australia on Saturday, 27 October 1934. The 230 mile race, which was organised by the Australian Racing Drivers Club, was contested on a handicap basis. The race was the richest and the longest that had been held in the state of Victoria to that time, and was the first road race in Australia to be open to "catalogued racing and sports cars of all powers". Of the 22 starters, eight finished within the limit of 25 minutes after the winner. The race was won by Mick Smith, competing under the name “Gardner”, and driving a Ford V8 Roadster.

The Grand Prix was an official event on the centenary program commemorating Edward Henty’s 1834 settlement at Portland, which led to the founding of the state of Victoria.

== Results ==
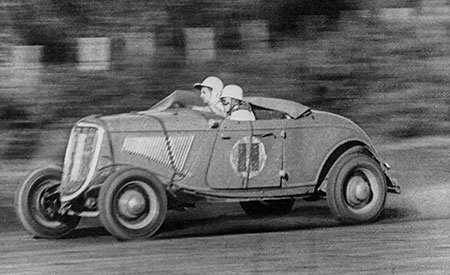
Mick Smith, competing under the name “Gardner”, won the Victorian Centenary Grand Prix driving a 1934 Ford V8 Roadster

Position	Driver	No.	Car	Entrant	Handicap	Race Time	Laps
1	"Gardner" (Mick Smith)	11	Ford V8 Roadster	"Gardner"	18m 5s	3:07:56	35
2	Les Murphy	18	MG P Type Midget	Lane's Motors	35m 35s	3:28:35	35
3	Ted McLean		Salmson	T. McLean	37m 20s	3:35:57	35
4	Barney Dentry		Dentry Special Riley	G. Barney Dentry	15m 10s	3:12:32	35
5	Murray Maxwell		MG P Type Midget	Lane's Motors	33m 50s		35
6	Bob Lea-Wright	21	Singer Le Mans	R.A. Lea-Wright	36m 10s		35
7	Ces Warren	1	MG Q Type Midget s/c	Britannia Motors	Scratch		35
8	Norman Putt		MG J2	Britannia Motors	36m 45s		35
DNF	Colin Keefer		MG J2	Britannia Motors	36m 45s		
DNF	Jim Skinner		MG J2	Britannia Motors	36m 45s		
DNF	R.G. Watson		Wolseley Hornet Special	Kellow-Falkiner Pty Ltd	35m 35s		
DNF	Campbell Graham		MG P Type Midget	Lane's Motors	35m 35s		
DNF	V. Maloney		MG Magna	Lane's Motors	29m 10s		
DNF	Ron Head		Riley Brooklands	W.E. Johnson	27m 25s		
DNF	J. Norman		Ballot 2 Litre	J. Norman	20m 35s		
DNF	Les Jennings		MG Magna	L. Jennings	19m 15s		
DNF	Bernie Horsley	10	MG J3 Midget	J.L. Hosley & W.B. Horsley	17m 30s		
DNF	Jack Clements		MG J3 Midget	Britannia Motors	17m 30s		
DNF	J.O. McCutcheon		Bugatti Type 37	K. MacMeikan	17m 30s		
DNF	Harry Beith		Chrysler 72	H.J. Beith	12m 50s		
DNF	Jack Williamson		Riley Imp	B.L. Cohen & W.H. Cameron	12m 50s		5
DNF	Bill Thompson		MG K3 Magnette s/c	Lane's Motors	1m 10s		
DNS	N.O. Hope		MG J3 Midget	N.O. Hope	17m 30s		-

Note: Non-finishers have been listed in starting order, due to lack of information regarding laps completed.

- Total race distance: 35 laps, 230 miles (370 km)
- Limit starter: Ted McLean
- Scratch starter: Ces Warren
- Winner's race time: 3:07:56
- Fastest time: "Gardner" (Mick Smith)
- Fastest lap: Ces Warren, 4:39 (84.74 mph)
- Teams prize: Lane's Motors
