= 1936 Australian Tourist Trophy =

Motor Racing event held in 1936

The 1936 Australian Tourist Trophy was a motor race staged at the Phillip Island circuit in Victoria, Australia on 30 March 1936. The race was held over 60 laps of the new 3.312 mile "triangular circuit", a total distance of 200 miles. It was open to factory built and catalogued racing cars and sports cars, irrespective of engine capacity. The race, which was organised by the Australian Racing Drivers Club, was contested on a handicap basis with the 'Limit' starter, HR Reeves (MG P-type), given a 38-minute start on the 'Scratch' starter, J McCutcheon (Day Special).

The race was won by JH Fagan driving an MG K3 Magnette. Of the sixteen starters only six finished and of those, only two were officially placed as the other four failed to complete the course within the prescribed time limit, which had been set at 15 minutes after the winner completed the race.

== Results ==
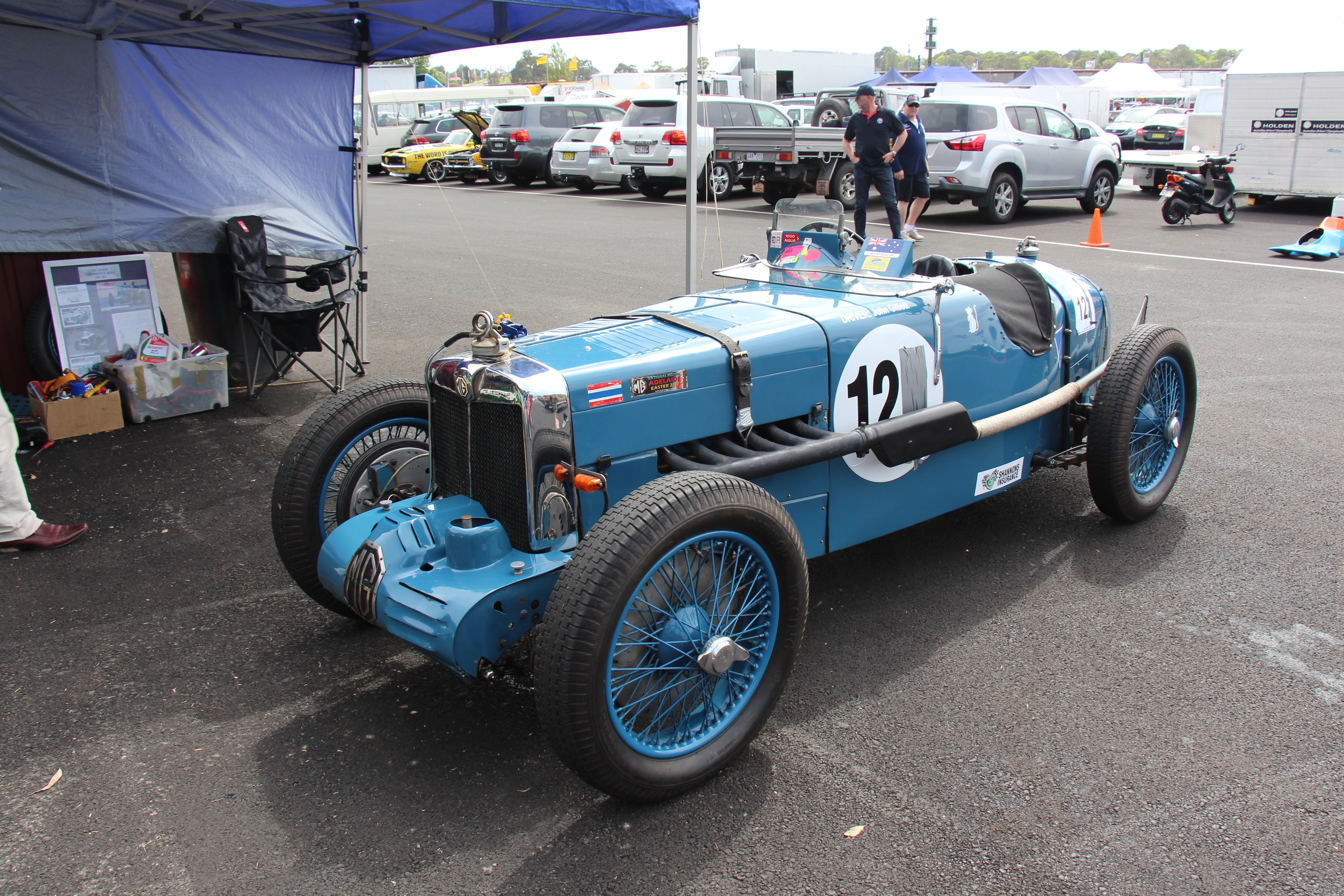
JH Fagan won the race driving an MG K3 Magnette, similar to the example pictured above

| Position | Driver | No. | Car | Entrant | Handicap start | Race time | Laps |
| 1 | Jim Fagan | 2 | MG K3 Magnette | | 3:00 | 3:06:15 | 60 |
| 2 | HR Reeve | 22 | MG P-type | | 38:00 | 3:59:04 | 60 |
| NC | VA Maloney | 11 | MG Magna | | 26:00 | | 58 |
| NC | George Martin | 18 | MG P-type | | 30:00 | | 56 |
| NC | P Tinkham | 10 | Bugatti | | 24:00 | | 49 |
| NC | T Hollindrake | 20 | MG J3 | HR Bryne | 33:00 | | 39 |
| DNF | Tom Peters | 3 | Bugatti | | 4:00 | | 43 |
| DNF | Les Burrows | 4 | Terraplane | | 5:00 | | |
| DNF | Bob Lea-Wright | | Terraplane | | | | |
| DNF | Harry Beith | 7 | Chrysler | | 11:00 | | 32 |
| DNF | H Drake Richmond | 17 | Bugatti | | 29:00 | | 23 |
| DNF | Lyster Jackson | 14 | Riley Imp | | 28:00 | | 23 |
| DNF | AL Barrett | 21 | Morris Special | | 35:00 | | 13 |
| DNF | FB Brosen | 9 | Ford Model A | | 24:00 | | |
| DNF | D Bowter | 19 | MG P-type | | 30:00 | | |
| DNF | H Abbott | 12 | Austin 7 | | 26:00 | | 2 |
| DNS | JO McCutcheon | 1 | Day Special | JA Day | Scratch | | - |

Notes:

- Attendance: More than 8,000
- Race distance: 60 laps, 200 miles
- Number of starters: 16
- Number of official finishers: 2
- Limit starter: HR Reeve (MG P-type)
- Scratch starter: J McCutcheon (Day Special) (DNS)
- Winner's average speed: 64 mph
- Fastest time: JH Fagan, (MG K3 Magnette), 3:06:15 (64 mph)

== See also ==
- Australian Tourist Trophy, for the unrelated sequence of races held since 1956.
- Australian Tourist Trophy (for motorcycles)
