= 1936 Victorian Sporting Car Club Trophy =

The 1936 Victorian Sporting Car Club Trophy was a motor race held at the Phillip Island circuit in Victoria, Australia on 1 January 1936. It was open to all cars, regardless of engine capacity. The race was staged over 35 laps of the 3 1/3 mile course, a total distance of 116 miles. It was contested on a handicap basis with the first starter, "W Gum", commencing the race 20 minutes and 25 seconds before the last starter, Les Burrows.

The race was won by Harry Beith, driving a Chrysler off a handicap of 2 minutes 20 seconds.

== Results ==
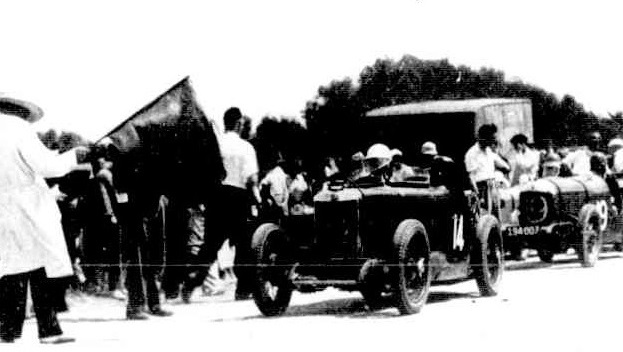
The MG J3 of Tom Hollinrake at the start of the race. Hollinrake placed third.

Position	Driver	No.	Car	Entrant	Handicap start	Race time	Laps
1	Harry Beith	4	Chrysler	H. J. Beith	2 m 20 s	1 h 38 m 34 s	35
2	W. Bullen	11	Singer	W. Bullen	9 m 55 s	1 h 57 m 39 s	35
3	Tom Hollinrake	14	MG J3	H. R. Syme	15 m 10 s	2 h 3 m 50 s	35
4	Les Burrows	1	Terraplane	L. Burrows	Scratch	1 h 48 m 45 s	35
5	Lyster Jackson	12	Riley Imp	L. G. Jackson	10 m 30 s	?	35
6	"J. Ainslie"	3	Vauxhall	"J. Ainslie"	1 m 10 s	?	35
7	H. N. Reeve	20	MG P Type	H. N. Reeve	14 m 35 s	?	35
8	Barney Dentry	9	Riley	G. B. Dentry	8 m 45 s	?	35
?	G. N. Pockett	5	Ford Model A	G. N. Pockett	2 m 55 s	-	?
?	A. Beasley	7	Willys 77	A. Beasley	5 m 50 s	-	?
?	G. C. Martin	10	MG J4 s/c	G. C. Martin	8 m 45 s	-	?
?	J. Clements	18	MG J2	J. Clements	14 m 00 s	-	?
?	A. Barrett	19	Morris Cowley	A. Barrett	14 m 35 s	-	?
DNF	B. P. Trinckham	8	Bugatti Type 30	B. P. Trinckham	8 m 10 s	-	?
DNF	Vin Maloney	16	MG Magna	V. A. Maloney	12 m 15 s	-	20
DNF	George Bastow	17	MG Magna	G. Bastow	12 m 15 s	-	15
DNF	"W. Gum"	21	Austin 7	"W. Gum"	20 m 25 s	-	8
DNS	W. Bullen	2	Terraplane	W. Bullen	Scratch	-	-
DNS	A. C. Smith	6	Bugatti	A. C. Smith	3 m 30 s	-	-
DNS	H. Drake-Richmond	15	Bugatti	H. Drake-Richmond	11 m 40 s	-	-

=== Notes ===
- Lap length: 3 and 1/3 miles
- Race distance: 35 laps, 116 miles
- Entries: 20
- Scratchings: 3
- Starters: 17
- Classified finishers (within time limit): 8
- Winners average speed: 64.1 mph
- Fastest Time: Harry Beith
- Fastest lap: Les Burrows, 2 m 25 s (67 mph) (new lap record)
- Attendance: Nearly 10,000
