= 1935 Winter 100 =

Motor race in Victoria, Australia

The 1935 Winter 100 was a motor race held at the Phillip Island circuit, near Cowes on Phillip Island, in Victoria, Australia on 3 June 1935. The race, which was organised by the Light Car Club of Australia, was staged over 16 laps, a total distance of 105.104 miles. It was contested on a handicap basis with the first car scheduled to start 21 minutes before the Scratch car.

The race was won by Alf Barrett driving a Morris Cowley from a handicap of 20 minutes 30 seconds. Bill Williamson driving a Riley Imp started from Scratch, set the fastest race time and the fastest race lap and was placed second on handicap.

== Results ==
Pos	Driver	No.	Car	Entrant	Handicap	Race time	Average speed	Laps	Remarks
1	Alf Barrett	15	Morris Cowley	A. Barrett	20m 30s	1h 39m 43s	63.24 mph	16	
2	Bill Williamson	1	Riley Imp	H. L. Cohen Motors Pty Ltd	Scratch	1h 22m 48s	76.15 mph	16	
3	Vin Maloney	10	MG Magna	V. A. Maloney	11m 10s	1h 35m 26s	66.10 mph	16	
4	Les Jennings	3	MG Magnette	L. Jennings	4m 30s	1h 28m 32s	70.98 mph	16	
5	Les Murphy	11	MG P Type	L. Murphy	11m 10s	1h 39m 50s	63.00 mph	16	
F.O.	Tom Hollindrake	8	MG J3	H. R. Syme	7m 45s			14	Flagged off
DNF	E. Nicholls	6	Bugatti Type 37	E. Nicholls	7m 10s			4	Clutch failure
DNF	A. G. Finlay	14	Bugatti Type 40	A. G. Finlay	19m 45s			3	Clutch failure
DNF	J. Sidebottom	16	Singer	J. Sidebottom	21m 00s			3	Clutch failure
DNF	Arthur Terdich	2	Bugatti Type 37A	A. J. Terdich	1m 00s			1	Piston failure
DNF	Eric McKay	12	Lombard AL.3	E. G. McKay	11m 45s			1	Crashed
DNF	Lester Jackson	9	Riley Imp	L. G. Jackson	9m 05s			1	Oil pressure failure
DNS	A. C. Smith	4	Bugatti	A. C. Smith	5m 50s				Did not start
DNS	H. Drake Richmond	5	Bugatti	H. Drake Richmond	7m 10s				Did not start
DNS	J. O. McCutcheon	7	Bugatti	A. J. Wylie	7m 10s				Did not start

=== Notes ===
- Entries: 15
- Starters: 12
- Finishers (within time limit): 5
- Time Limit: 1h 45m
- Fastest time: Bill Williamson, 1h 22m 48s, 76.15 mph
- Fastest lap: Bill Williamson, 5m 1s, 78 mph

== Race name ==
Sources vary as to the actual race name with "Winter 100", "winter 100 miles race" and "100-miles Winter Handicap" all being used in contemporary sources. The Light Car Club of Australia, the organizing body for the race, published the results under the name Winter "100".
