= MG Midget (disambiguation) =

The MG Midget is a small two-seater lightweight sports car produced by MG from 1961 to 1979.

MG Midget may also refer to any of several earlier cars produced by the same company:

- MG M-type, produced between 1928 and 1932
- MG C-type, produced between 1931 and 1932
- MG D-type, produced between 1931 and 1932
- MG J-type, produced between 1932 and 1934 (models J1, J2, J3 and J4)
- MG P-type, produced between 1934 and 1936 (models PA and PB)
- MG Q-type, produced during 1934 (model QA)
- MG R-type, produced during 1935 (model RA)
- MG T-type, produced between 1936 and 1955 (models TA, TB, TC, TD and TF)
