= 1935 Jubilee Handicap =

The Jubilee Handicap was a motor race staged at the Phillip Island circuit in Victoria, Australia on 6 May 1935. The race, which was organised by the Victorian Sporting Car Club, was contested on a handicap basis over a distance of 100 miles.

The race was won by H. Abbott driving an Austin Brooklands. Abbott, who was the "limit man", started the race 18 minutes before "scratch" starters J. Pockett (Ford V8) and Barney Dentry (Riley) His winning margin over second placed L. Burrows (Terraplane) was one second with third placed C. Pickworth (Terraplane) a further 27 seconds behind.

== Entries ==
There were fifteen entries for the race.

Driver	Car	Handicap
J. Pockett	Ford V8	Scratch
C. Pickworth	Terraplane	Scratch
L. Burrows	Terraplane	Scratch
B. Dentry	Riley	1m 32s
J. Day	Bugatti 8 s/c	2m 8s
L. Jennings	MG Magnette	6m 8s
E. McKay	Lombard s/c	8m 48s
H. Beith	Chrysler	11m 8s
H. Norman	MG Magnette	11m 28m
V. Moloney	MG Magna	12m 48s
L. Jackson	Riley Imp	12m 48s
L. Murphy	MG P Type	12m 48s
J. Sidebottom	Singer	15m 28s
H. Allen	Singer Le Mans	16m 48s
H. Abbott	Austin Brooklands	18m 8s

Note: Handicaps as published with the race report in The Argus on 7 May differ in some cases from those published with the list of entries in The Argus on 29 April.

== Race results ==
Pos.	Driver	Car	Handicap	Race Time
1	H. Abbott	Austin Brooklands	18 m	1h 35m 22s
2	L. Burrows	Terraplane	2 m	1h 19m 23s
3	C. Pickworth	Terraplane	3 m 45s	1h 22m 41s
4	Les Murphy	MG P Type	10m	1h 28m 18s
5	Barney Dentry	Riley	Scratch	1h 18m 40s
DNF	J. Pockett	Ford V8	Scratch	-

Details of the other eight starters have not yet been ascertained.

=== Race statistics ===
- Number of entries: 15
- Number of starters: 14
- Limit starter: H. Abbott (Austin Brooklands)
- Scratch starters: J. Pockett (Ford V8) & Barney Dentry (Riley)
- Fastest Lap: Barney Dentry (Riley), 5m 10s (76.25 mph)
- Fastest Time: Barney Dentry (Riley), 1h 18m 40s
