= 1938 Phillip Island Grand Prix =

The 1938 Phillip Island Grand Prix was a motor race staged at the Phillip Island triangular circuit in Victoria, Australia on Labor Day, 28 March 1938. The race was contested over 35 laps, approximately 116 miles. It was staged by the Victorian Sporting Car Club and was contested on a handicap basis with the first car, driven by G.A. Cowper, starting 29 minutes and 45 seconds before the last car, driven by G.M. Joshua.

The race was won by Arthur Beasley driving a Singer Le Mans.

== Results ==
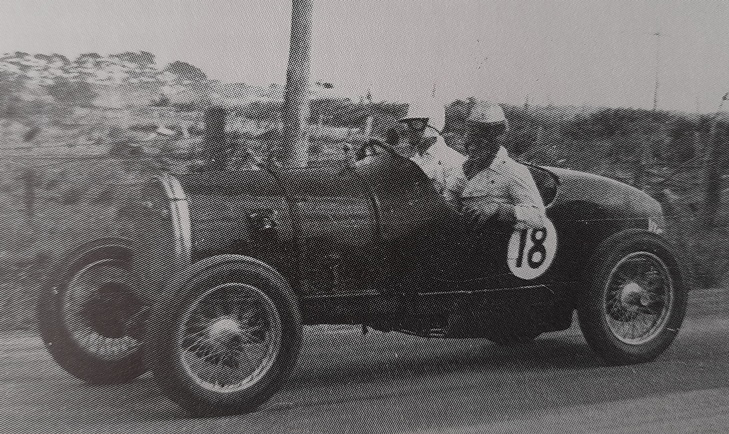
The Bugatti Brescia of Tom McNamara contesting the 1938 Phillip Island Grand Prix. It did not finish the race.

Position	Driver	No.	Car	Entrant	Handicap	Time	Laps
1	Arthur Beasley		Singer Le Mans		17m 30s	1h 56m 17s	35
2	K.R. McDonald		Standard		18m 00s	1h 58m 16s	35
3	Jack O'Dea		MG P Type		17m 00s	1h 58m 53s	35
4	Jack Phillips		Ford V8		1m 45s	1h 44m 21s	35
5	Harry Beith		Terraplane		5m 15s	1h 49m 54s	35
NC	G.A. Cowper		Morris		29m 45s		
NC	G. Dentry		Riley Special		5m 00s		
NC	C.A. Williamson		Chrysler		9m 15s		
NC	J. Lanham		Bugatti		19m 15s		
DNF	Jim Boughton	14	Morgan 4-4		17m 30s		
DNF	Les Burrows		Terraplane		5m 45s		34
DNF	A. Aitken		Riley Brooklands		15m 15s		32
DNF	Tom McNamara	18	Bugatti Brescia		19m 15s		30
DNF	G. Winton		AC		8m 15s		21
DNF	A. Hay		Ford V8		8m 15s		
DNF	Bob Lea-Wright		Terraplane		5m 15s		5
Dsq	Tim Joshua		Frazer Nash		Scratch		
DNS	A.C. Sinclair		BMW		8m 15s		

Key.
NC: Still running at finish but not classified as finisher
DNF: Did not finish
Dsq: Disqualified
DNS: Did not start

== Notes ==
- There were 17 starters in the race.
- Limit starter: G.A. Cowper (Morris)
- Scratch starter: G.M. Joshua (Frazer Nash)
- Nine competitors were on the course at the finish.
- Only five competitors finished the course in the required time.
- Winner's average speed: 60 mph
- Fastest Time: J. Phillips (Ford V8), 1h 44m 21s (66.6 mph)
- Fastest Lap: H. Beith (Terraplane) and J. Phillips (Ford V8)
