= 1935 Australian Race Drivers' Cup =

The 1935 Australian Race Drivers' Cup was a motor race staged at the Phillip Island circuit in Victoria, Australia on 5 November 1935. The race was contested as an "all powers" handicap over a total distance of 116 miles. It was the first event to be held on a new and improved 3.312 mile triangular road course which replaced the previous six mile rectangular layout.

The race, which was organised by the Australian Racing Drivers Club, was won by Les Burrows driving a Terraplane.

== Results ==
Position	Driver	Car	Handicap	Time	Speed (mph)	Laps
1	Les Burrows	Terraplane	4m 15s	1h 47m 21s	64.83	35
2	G Bastow	Singer Le Mans	16m 09s	2h 00m 37s	57.70	
3	H Beith	Chrysler		1h 50m 43s	62.84	
4	A Beasley	Willys		1h 55m 25s	60.30	
5	L Murphy	MG P Type		2h 02m 17s	56.92	
6	T Peters	Bentley 4½ Litre	2m 50s	1h 50m 59s	62.70	
DNF	EJ Buckley	Hudson	Scratch			0

=== Notes ===
- Entries: 17
- Number of starters: Unknown
- Number of finishers: Unknown
- Limit starter: G Bastow
- Scratch starter: EJ Buckley
- Fastest lap: L Burrows (Terraplane), 3m 0s, 66.24 mph
