= 1934 Phillip Island 100 =

The 1934 Phillip Island 100 was a motor race staged at the Phillip Island circuit in Victoria, Australia on 1 January 1934. The 100 mile race, which was organised by the Light Car Club of Australia, was attended by over 8,000 people. It was contested on a handicap basis with the limit starter, JW Williamson, commencing the race 17 minutes before the scratch starter, WB Thompson. A competitor had to complete the course within the prescribed time limit of 1¾ hours to be classified as a finisher.

The race was won by JW Williamson driving a Riley.

== Race results ==
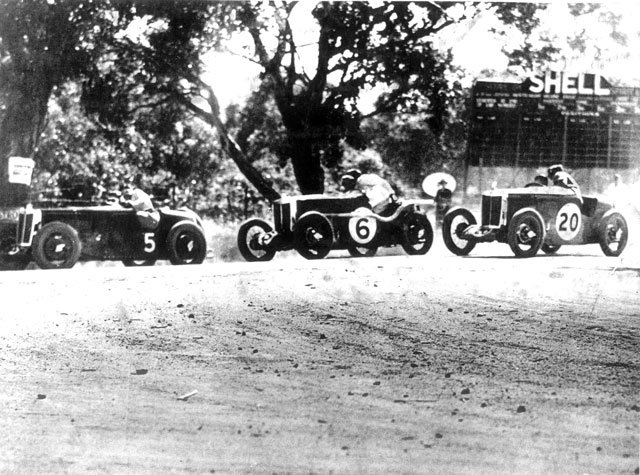
The MGs of Jennings, Warren & Murphy (left to right) contesting the 1934 Phillip Island 100

Position	Driver	No.	Car	Capacity	Entrant	Race time	Handicap	Laps
1	JW Williamson	32	Riley	1087 cc	JW Williamson	91 min 26 sec	17:00	16
2	JO McCutcheon	7	Bugatti	1496 cc	K MacMeikan		6:00	16
3	GB Dentry	8	Riley	10936 cc	GB Dentry		6:00	16
4	AJ Terdich	2	Bugatti	1540 cc s/c	AJ Terdich		3:00	16
5	L Jennings	5	MG Magna	1087 cc	L Jennings		5:00	16
6	NF Putt	19	MG Magna	1250 cc	Britannia Motors Pty Ltd		12:00	16
7	LP Murphy	20	MG Midget	847 cc	LP Murphy		12:00	16
NC	H Drake-Richmond	12	Bugatti	1498 cc	H Drake-Richmond		7:30	15
NC	CR Warren	6	MG Midget	747 cc s/c	Britannia Motors Pty Ltd		5:00	15
NC	JF Clements	3	Bugatti	1992 cc	J Clements		3:30	15
DNF	WB Thompson	1	Bugatti	1496 cc s/c	WB Thompson		Scratch	10
DNF	CW Junker	4	Bugatti	1496 cc	CW Junker		4:30	?
DNF	R Lea Wright	18	Singer Nine	972 cc	A Beasley		12:00	?
DNF	E Nichol	9	Bugatti	1946 cc	E Nichol		6:00	?
DNF	K McKinney	11	Austin Seven	747 cc s/c	K McKinney		7:00	5
DNF	JH McGrath	14	Bugatti	1496 cc	JH McGrath		7:30	2
DNF	G Disher	17	Salmson	1097 cc	G Disher		11:00	0

=== Notes ===
- Starters: 17
- Classified finishers: 7
- Unclassified: 3 (All were on their last lap when the time limit expired)
- Retirements: 7
- Fastest lap: WB Thompson, time unknown, (average speed of approximately 83 mph)
- Fastest time: JO McCutcheon, 80 minutes 27 seconds
