= 1936 Benalla Centenary Race =

Australian motor race held in 1936

The 1936 Benalla Centenary Race was a motor race staged at the Benalla Circuit at Benalla in Victoria, Australia on Easter Monday, 13 April 1936. The 100-mile race, which was organised by the Victorian Sporting Car Club, was open to cars of 'all powers'. It was contested on a handicap basis with the 'Limit Man', J O’Dea (MG), given a 20-minute start on the 'Scratch Man', Jack Day (Day Special"). The race, which was organised to celebrate the centenary of the town of Benalla, was claimed to be the first road race to be contested on the Victorian mainland.

B Dentry (Riley Special), was flagged in as the winner of the race but rechecks after protests had been lodged saw the victory awarded to Les Murphy (MG P-type). Further checks conducted overnight resulted in Vin Maloney (MG Magna) being declared the winner from Dentry and Murphy.

== Race results ==
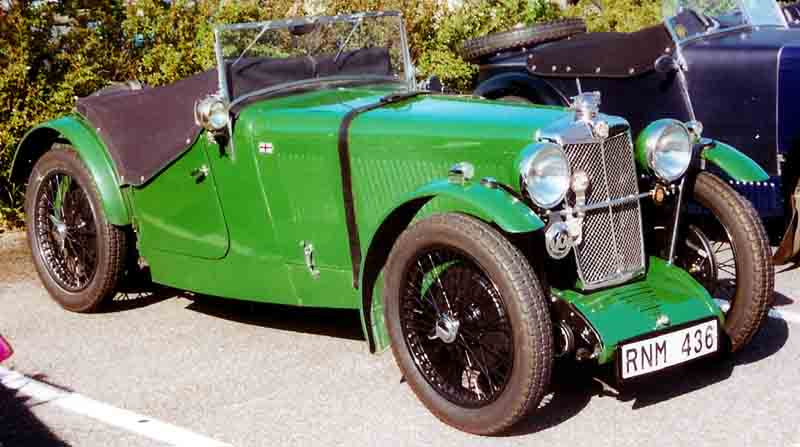
An MG Magna similar to that driven by race winner Vin Maloney

Position	Driver	No.	Car	Entrant	Race time	Laps
1	Vin Maloney		MG Magna		1:47:27	40
2	B Dentry		Riley Special		1:44:11	40
3	Les Murphy		MG P-type	W Brown	1:53:24	40
4	Bob Lea-Wright		Terraplane		1:39:14	40
5	J O'Dea		MG			
?	G Martin		MG Magna			
?	L Allen		Singer			
?	W Hope		Singer			
?	M Wreford		Riley Imp			
?	C Keefer		Riley Imp			
?	L Jackson		Riley Imp			
?	B Tinckham		Bugatti			
?	Harry Beith		Terraplane			
?	K Latty		Ford V8			
?	J Phillips		Ford V8			
DNF	A Roseborough		Chrysler			
DNF	Jack Day		Day Special			22
DNF	H Reeve		MG Magna			18

Notes:

- Attendance: More than 20,000
- Total race distance: 40 laps, 100 miles (160 km)
- Number of starters: 18
- Winner's race time: 1:47:27
- Fastest time: Bob Lea-Wright (Terraplane), 1:39:14
- Fastest lap: Jack Day (Day Special), 2:19, 65 mph
