= Phillip Island Grand Prix Circuit =

Race track in Victoria, Australia

- Modern Grand Prix Circuit (1988–present)
- Location: Ventnor, Phillip Island, Victoria
- Coordinates: 38°30′11″S 145°14′11″E
- FIA Grade: 3
- Owner: Linfox
- Opened: 31 March 1928; 98 years ago (Road circuit); 15 December 1952; 73 years ago (modern circuit); Re-opened: 4 December 1988; 37 years ago
- Closed: 1940 (Road circuit); 1978 (modern circuit)
- Major events: Current: Grand Prix motorcycle racing Australian motorcycle Grand Prix (1989–1990, 1997–2019, 2022–2026); World SBK (1990–1992, 1994–2020, 2022–2027); Future: Supercars Championship; Phillip Island SuperSprint (1990, 1993–2003, 2005–2007, 2009, 2012–2016, 2019, 2027); Phillip Island 500 (1976–1977, 2008–2011, 2017–2018); Grand Finale (2005–2007); Former: Trans-Am Australia (2021–2024); FIM EWC (1991–1992); Armstrong 500 (1960–1962); Australian Grand Prix (Road Circuit) (1928–1935)
- Website: https://www.phillipislandcircuit.com.au/

Modern Grand Prix Circuit (1988–present)
- Surface: Asphalt
- Length: 4.448 km (2.764 mi)
- Turns: 12
- Race lap record: 1:24.0607 ( (Australia) Tim Slade, Brabham BT62, 2022, Sports car racing)

Grand Prix Circuit (1952–1978)
- Surface: Asphalt
- Length: 4.800 km (2.983 mi)
- Turns: 11
- Race lap record: 1:47.900 ( (Australia) John Harvey, McLaren M6B, 1972, Group A)

Road Course (1936–1940)
- Surface: Gravel
- Length: 5.330 km (3.312 mi)
- Turns: 4

Road Course (1928–1935)
- Surface: Gravel
- Length: 10.6 km (6.6 mi)
- Turns: 4
- Race lap record: 4:49.4 ( (Australia) Bill Thompson, Bugatti Type 37A, 1932)

The Phillip Island Grand Prix Circuit is a motor racing circuit located near Ventnor, on Phillip Island, Victoria, Australia. The current circuit was first used in 1952.

Along with The Bend Motorsport Park in South Australia, the 4.448 km (2.764 mi) long island circuit is one of two race tracks in Australia to carry a FIM Category A track licence which allows for the highest level of motorcycle racing, MotoGP. Phillip Island also carries an FIA Grade 3 track licence.

== History ==
=== Road Circuit ===
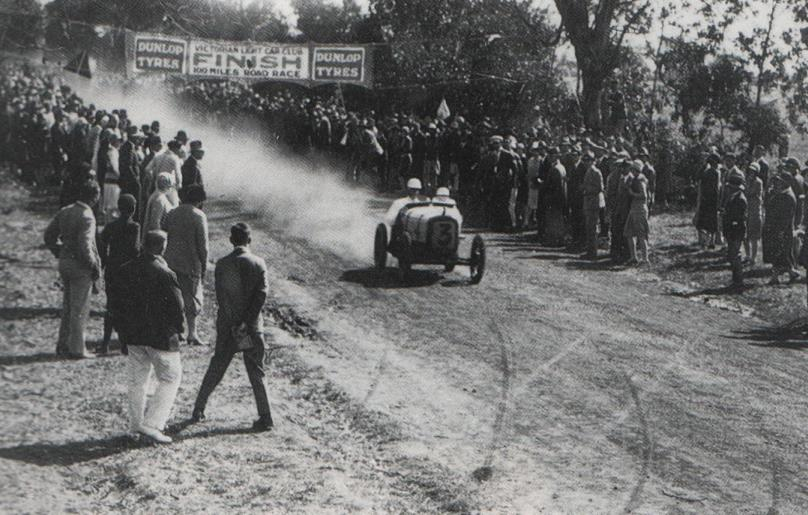
Arthur Waite won the 1928 100 Miles Road Race on the Phillip Island road circuit driving an Austin 7

Motor racing on Phillip Island began in 1928 with the running of the 100 Miles Road Race, an event which has since become known as the first Australian Grand Prix. It utilised a high speed rectangle of local closed-off public roads with four similar right hand corners. The course length varied, with the car course approximately 6 mi (9.7 km) per lap, compared to the motorcycle circuit which was approximately 10 mi (16 km) in length. The circuit was the venue for the Australian Grand Prix through to 1935 and it was used for the last time on 6 May 1935 for the Jubilee Day Races.

A new 3.312 mi (5.330 km) triangular circuit utilising the pit straight from the original rectangular course was subsequently mapped out and first used for the Australian Race Drivers' Cup on 5 November 1935. The final car event on the circuit was held on Cup Day (1 November) 1938 and the final motorcycle race meeting was conducted on 30 January 1940.

Significant events staged at the Phillip Island road circuit included:

- 1928 100 Miles Road Race
- 1929 Australian Grand Prix
- 1930 Australian Grand Prix
- 1931 Australian Grand Prix
- 1932 Australian Grand Prix
- 1933 Australian Grand Prix
- 1934 Phillip Island 100
- 1934 Australian Grand Prix
- 1934 Winter 100
- 1934 Victorian Centenary Grand Prix
- 1935 Centenary 300
- 1935 Australian Grand Prix
- 1935 Jubilee Handicap
- 1935 Winter 100
- 1935 Australian Race Drivers' Cup
- 1936 Victorian Sporting Car Club Trophy
- 1936 Australian Tourist Trophy
- 1937 Phillip Island Trophy
- 1938 Phillip Island Grand Prix

=== Grand Prix Circuit ===
==== 1952–1962 ====
In 1951, a group of six local businessmen decided to build a new track. About 2 km (1.2 mi) away from the original circuit, it still bears the corner name signs of the original circuit. As the piece of available land was on the edge of the coast, the track is known for its steep grades – the highest 57 metres – which caused cost overruns and delays in track opening. The new track was opened in 1952 and in 1960 the first Armstrong 500 production car race was held at the circuit. Extensive damage resulted from the running of the 1962 Armstrong 500, and, with the circuit owners unable to finance repairs, the circuit was closed and the race was moved to the Mount Panorama Circuit at Bathurst in New South Wales, to eventually become known as the Bathurst 1000.

==== 1967–1978 ====
The circuit reopened in October 1967 and hosted the Phillip Island 500 endurance race, a round of the Australian Manufacturers' Championship, from 1971 to 1977. The race was also a round of the Australian Touring Car Championship in 1976 and 1977. But again, due to its testing terrain, the circuit required significant maintenance and slowly declined through the 1970s. It was farmed by its owners while closed and was then sold in 1985 in preparation for reopening, but did not do so until 1988 after agreement on a long-term lease and rebuild agreement. During the time the circuit deteriorated and finally closed, part of the main problem for its owners was that the Phillip Island Bridge from the island to the Australian mainland reportedly could not carry the heavy vehicles needed to resurface the circuit. This meant that the bitumen surface was a cold mix which easily broke up under the rigours of racing, instead of the standard hot mix which would have allowed a more durable surface. It would not be until the mid-1980s that the bridge would be rebuilt allowing the necessary equipment needed for resurfacing.

==== 1988–present ====
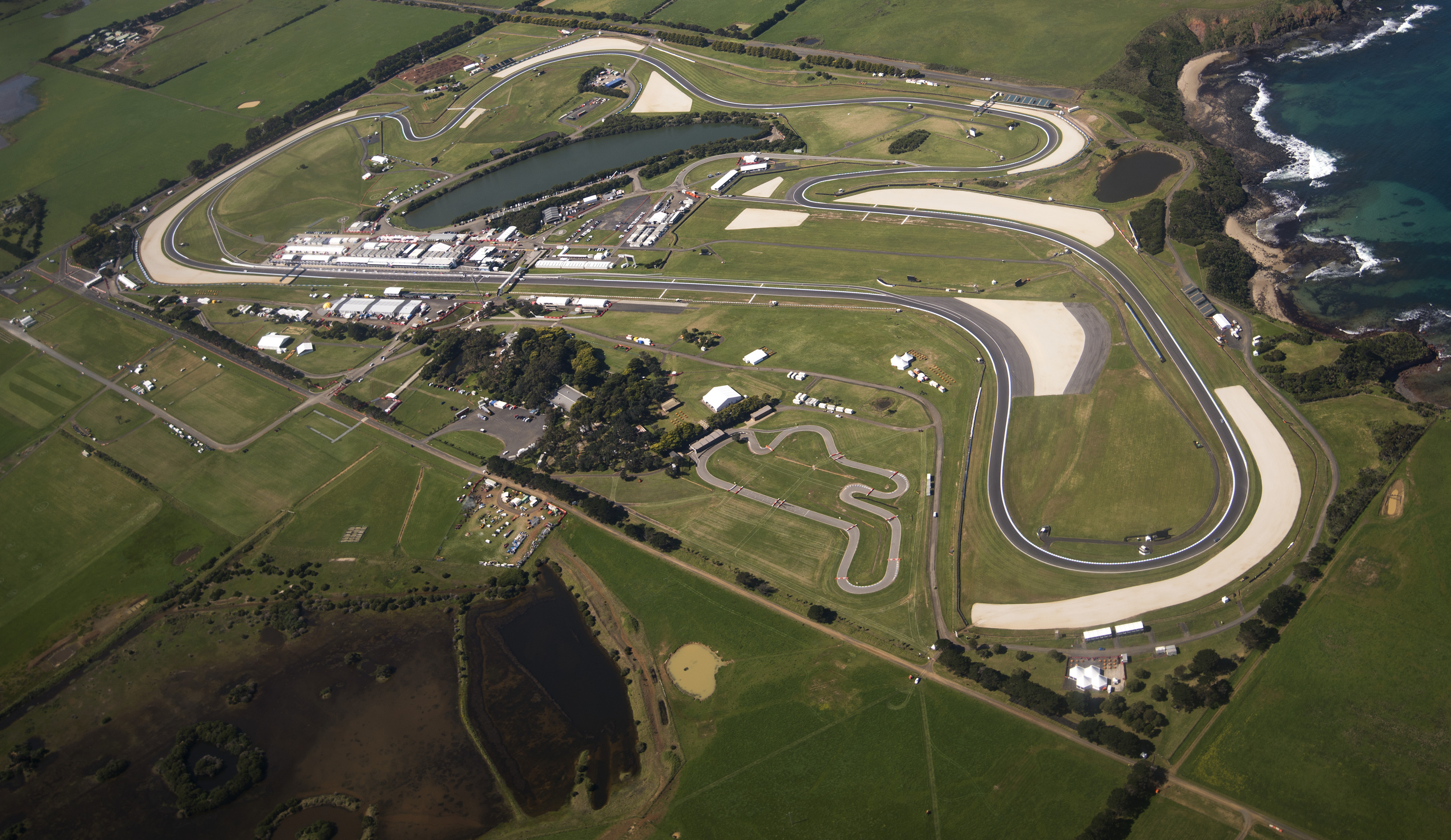
Aerial view of the circuit

The circuit was refurbished with a reduced length of 4.448 km (2.764 mi) and was reopened on 4 December 1988 for the final round of the 1988 Swann Insurance International Series for motorcycles.

In 1989, the Australian Motorcycle Grand Prix joined the FIM Road Racing World Championship calendar for the first time, and was held at Phillip Island. The 1989 race saw a race long dice in the 500 cc division between local favourites Wayne Gardner and Kevin Magee, along with Wayne Rainey and Christian Sarron. The race was won by 1987 World Champion Gardner to the delight of the huge crowd. Gardner would make it two in a row at the Island in 1990 before the race moved to Eastern Creek in Sydney for 1991. The Australian Motorcycle Grand Prix would remain at Eastern Creek until it returned permanently to Phillip Island from 1997 onwards.

Phillip Island hosted its first Superbike World Championship round in 1990, taking over from Sydney's Oran Park Raceway as the Australian round of the series. Local riders Peter Goddard (Yamaha FZR750) and Rob Phillis (Kawasaki ZXR750) won the two races for what was Round 12 of the season, with Goddard having secured pole position. The World Superbike round continues to be held annually at Phillip Island to this day.

In 1990, the Australian Touring Car Championship (ATCC) returned to the circuit for the first time since 1977, this time as a sprint round. Dick Johnson won the round in his Ford Sierra RS500, in what was to be his final ever round victory. The event was not held in 1991 or 1992, but was reinstated to the calendar in 1993, with the sprint format then continuing every year until 2004. By then, the ATCC was known as V8 Supercars. After not appearing on the calendar in 2004, from 2005 to 2007, Phillip Island hosted the Grand Finale; the final round of the V8 Supercars season. In each year, the event decided that year's champion, including in controversial circumstances in 2006. From 2008 to 2011, Phillip Island returned to hosting a 500 km race, this time known for sponsorship reasons as the L&H 500. The Phillip Island 500 replaced Sandown's Sandown 500 as the annual V8 Supercar 500 km race, an event which was later reinstated for 2012. Since then, Phillip Island has returned to hosting a sprint round of the championship, which has become known as the Phillip Island Super Sprint.

The Australian Motorcycle Grand Prix has always been more of a promoter event than a profit-raiser in itself. The contract was prolonged until 2026, although tobacco advertising has been banned since 2007.

=== Important dates ===
- 1951: A historically significant meeting of six local businessmen decided to re-establish motor racing at Phillip Island.
- 1952: A steering committee formed and the Phillip Island Auto Racing Club (PIARC) developed with a dream "to build Australia's first international grand prix circuit".The current site was purchased in that year. PIARC calls for 7000 subscriptions at 10 pounds each to assist in the development of the circuit and building work begins. An Alfa was used to measure the three-mile distance required for international certification as an International Circuit.
- 1957: Phillip Island stages numerous trophy races including the Australian Motorsport Magazine Trophy Race 1957, the Formula Libre race of 1958 and the Phillip Island Trophy race of 1958.
- 1960: The inaugural Armstrong 500 endurance race is won by Frank Coad and John Roxburgh driving a Vauxhall Cresta. They completed the race in 8 hours 15 minutes.
- 1962: The circuit is damaged during the running of the 1962 Armstrong 500 and is subsequently closed to racing.
- 1964: Businessman and former Australian Drivers' Champion Len Lukey purchases the circuit with a view to redevelopment. Today, a corner on the circuit is named after Lukey.
- 1967: The circuit reopens with a newly laid surface at the "Grand Re-Opening Meeting" on 22 October 1967.
- 1971: The first Phillip Island 500K endurance race is held
- 1978: The circuit is closed, having become virtually unusable for modern racing and, between 1979 and 1982, it is used only for historic rallies and cub sprints.
- 1985: Phillip Island Circuit purchased by Placetac Pty Ltd, with the view to re-introducing racing to the famous facility.
- 1988: The circuit is refurbished with a reduced length of 4.449 kilometres and is reopened on 4 December 1988 for the final round of the 1988 Swann Insurance International Series for motorcycles.
- 1989: The 1989 Australian motorcycle Grand Prix, the first World Championship round in Australia, is held at the circuit on 9 April.

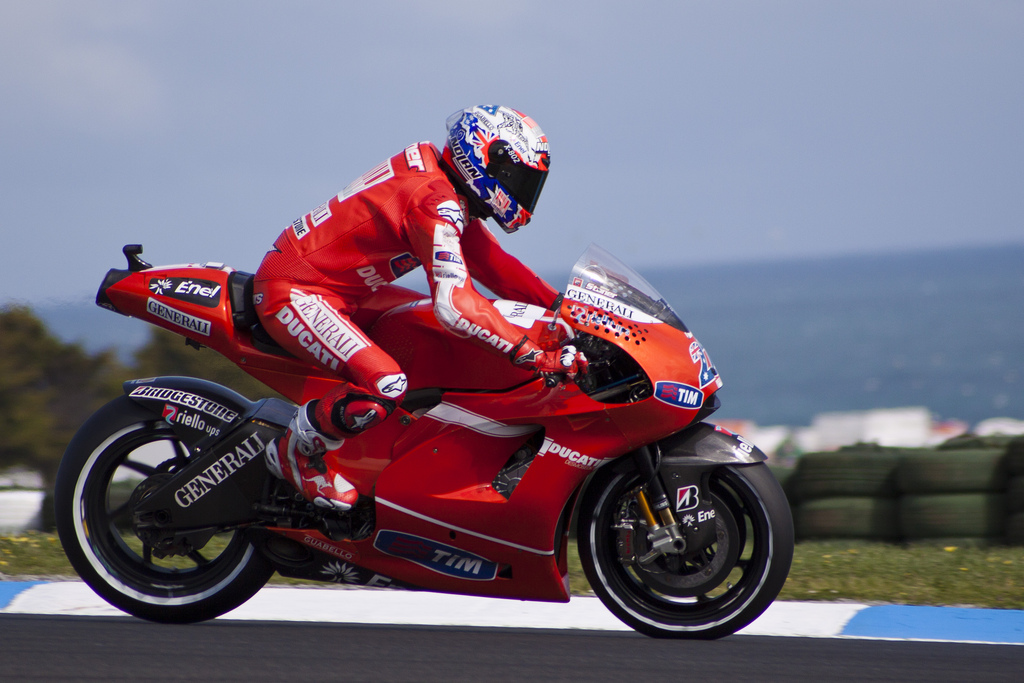
Casey Stoner in action at the 2010 Australian motorcycle Grand Prix at the Phillip Island Grand Prix Circuit.

- 1990: Phillip Island hosts its first round of the Superbike World Championship. The circuit also hosts its first sprint round of the Australian Touring Car Championship.
- 1996: Australian superbike rider, Troy Corser, wins the Superbike World Championship on board a Ducati at the October race at Phillip Island.
- 1997: The Australian motorcycle Grand Prix returns to Phillip Island, where it becomes a permanent fixture.
- 1998: Australian Michael Doohan wins the motorcycle Grand Prix. The first corner is named after him.
- 2000: Simon Wills sets a longstanding outright lap record of the circuit in the Formula Holden category.
- 2004: The circuit and surrounding land is purchased by the Linfox corporation with a view to complement the circuit with facilities such as an 18-hole Greg Norman-designed golf course and a 5-star hotel.
- 2006: A multimillion-dollar re-development was undertaken in late 2006 by the Linfox Group, including the construction of a new karting circuit.
- 2008: The Phillip Island 500 is run for the first time since 1977, this time for V8 Supercars. The race is held four times before once again becoming defunct.
- 2012: Australian Casey Stoner wins his sixth consecutive Australian Motorcycle Grand Prix, as well as his last career Grand Prix victory. Before the race, the third corner of the circuit is named after Stoner.
- 2014: Jamie Whincup becomes the first ever driver to win a sixth ATCC/V8 Supercars title by winning the second Saturday race at the Plus Fitness Phillip Island 400.
- 2026 With MotoGP moving to Adelaide in 2027, the final race at the Phillip Island circuit is scheduled for 25th October 2026, but was cancelled due to bad weather.

== Events ==
Current

- February: Superbike World Championship, Supersport World Championship, Australian Superbike Championship
- March: GT World Challenge Australia GT Festival Phillip Island, GT4 Australia Series, Ferrari Challenge Australasia, Porsche Sprint Challenge Australia, Mustang Cup Australia, Phillip Island Classic
- August: Australian Prototype Series
- October: Australian motorcycle Grand Prix, Australian Superbike Championship
- November: Island Magic

Future

- Supercars Championship
  - Phillip Island SuperSprint (1976–1977, 1990, 1993–2003, 2005–2007, 2009, 2012–2016, 2019, 2027)

Former

- Armstrong 500 (1960–1962)
- AU4 Australian Championship (2015–2019, 2025)
- Aussie Racing Cars (2010–2012, 2014–2016, 2018, 2024)
- Australian GT Production Car Championship (1994–1999, 2001–2002)
- Australian Improved Production Nationals (1994, 1999, 2004, 2009, 2026, 2025)
- Australian Mini Challenge (2008–2010)
- Australian National Trans-Am Series (2021–2024)
- Australian Nations Cup Championship (2002–2003)
- Australian Performance Car Championship (2002–2003, 2005–2006)
- Australian Production Car Series (2003, 2005–2008, 2010–2019, 2023–2024)
- Australian Sports Car Championship (1970–1977)
- Australian Super Touring Championship (1993–1998)
- Australian Tourist Trophy (1936, 1976–1977, 2009–2012, 2014–2015)
- FIM Endurance World Championship (1991–1992)
- Porsche Carrera Cup Australia Championship (2003, 2005–2006, 2008, 2011–2012, 2014–2015, 2017–2019)
- S5000 Australian Drivers' Championship (2021–2023)
- Sidecar World Championship (1999–2000)
- Supercars Championship
  - Grand Finale (2005–2007)
  - Phillip Island 500 (2008–2011, 2017–2018)
- TCR Australia Touring Car Series (2019, 2021–2024)
- Touring Car Masters (2007–2008, 2012–2016, 2019)
- V8 Ute Racing Series (2003, 2006–2007, 2010, 2016–2017)
- Grand Prix motorcycle racing (1989-1990, 1997-2019, 2022-2026)

== Lap records ==
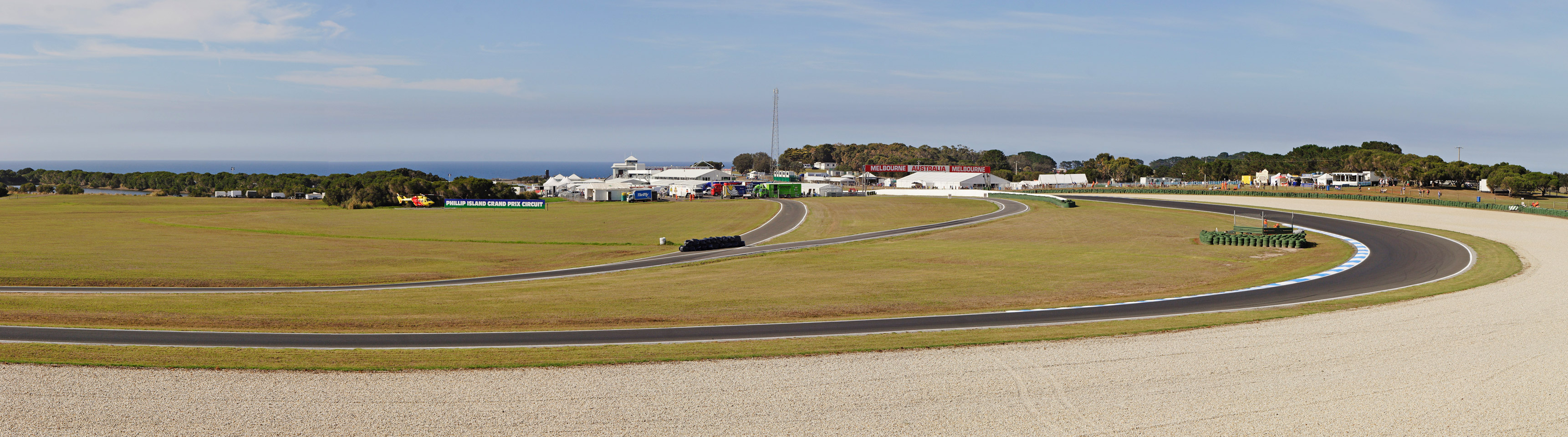
Phillip Island Grand Prix Circuit Panorama showing turn 12 heading on to the 900m Gardner Straight

In the early 1990s, Phillip Island was used during the Australian summer for pre-season testing by various World Sportscar Championship teams and some Japanese Formula 3000 teams (who generally found travelling to Australia was actually cheaper than paying some $5,000 per hour to hire the Honda owned Suzuka Circuit in Japan). While no official lap times were published, television commentator and race driver Neil Crompton reported in 1990 that the Nissan Motorsports International team with drivers Julian Bailey and Mark Blundell driving the Nissan R90C were able to lap the circuit in around 1:18, while a 3.0 Litre Mugen V8-powered Dome F3000 (which Crompton drove) was able to record similar lap times. At the time the fastest Australian cars that raced at Phillip Island were the 3.8 Litre V6-powered Formula Holdens, which were approximately 10 seconds per lap slower.

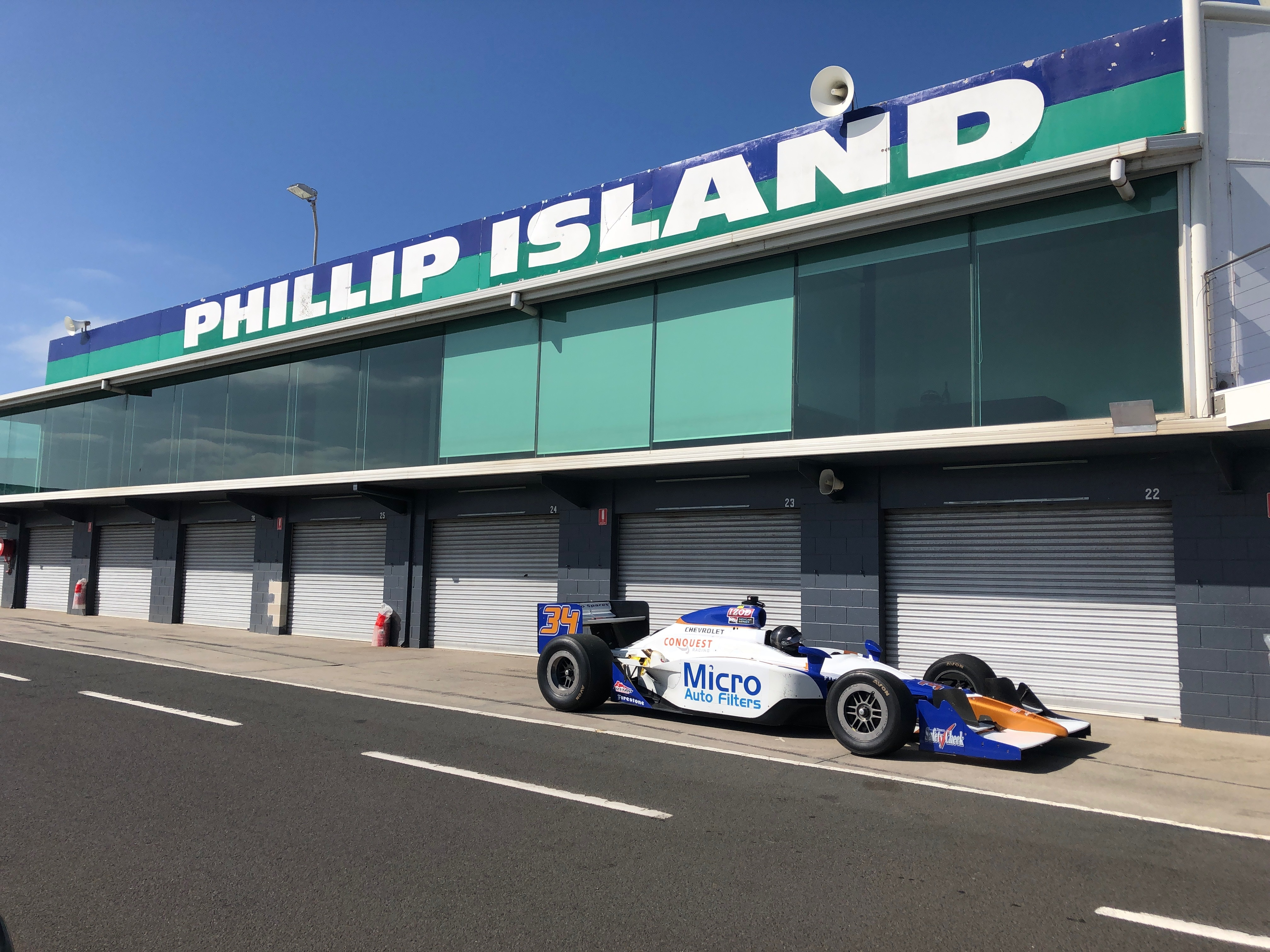
The Dallara IR-05 driven by Mathew Radisich

In late October 2018 Mathew Radisich drove his 2011 ex-Conquest Racing IndyCar during testing at Phillip Island as a part of unofficial practice day, with images distributed online of his recorded Cosworth data showing a lap time of 1:17.005. However, as this time was not set during a race meeting, it does not count as an official lap record.

As of March 2026, the fastest official race lap records at Phillip Island Grand Prix Circuit are listed as:

Category	Time	Driver	Vehicle	Date
Modern Grand Prix Circuit (1988–present): 4.448 km (2.764 mi)
Sports car racing	1:24.0607	(Australia) Tim Slade	Brabham BT62	15 May 2022
Formula Holden	1:24.2215	(New Zealand) Simon Wills	Reynard 94D	13 February 2000
Formula 3	1:24.5146	(Australia) Tim Macrow	Dallara F307	21 September 2013
GT3	1:25.5964	(New Zealand) Brendon Leitch	Audi R8 LMS Evo II	24 August 2024
S5000	1:25.6797	(Australia) Joey Mawson	Ligier JS F3-S5000	13 March 2021
Group 2A Sports Cars	1:25.9294	(United Kingdom) James Winslow	Radical SR8	25 May 2013
Sports Sedans	1:27.2757	(Australia) Jack Perkins	Audi A4-Chevrolet	11 September 2016
Formula 5000	1:27.4435	(Australia) Tom Tweedie	Chevron B24/28	11 March 2018
MotoGP	1:27.765	(Spain) Marc Márquez	Ducati Desmosedici GP23	20 October 2024
Superkart	1:28.1232	(Australia) Russell Jamieson	Anderson Maverick-DEA	21 September 2013
Sports Racer Series	1:28.4211	(Australia) Roger I'Anson	West WR1000 Kawasaki	21 September 2014
Formula One	1:28.5217	(Australia) John Bowe	March 741	19 March 2017
World SBK	1:28.564	(Italy) Nicolò Bulega	Ducati Panigale V4 R	24 February 2024
Ferrari Challenge	1:29.6814	(Australia) Antoine Gittany	Ferrari 296 Challenge	6 April 2025
Moto2	1:30.253	(Spain) Albert Arenas	Kalex Moto2	19 October 2025
Australian Superbikes	1:30.790	(Australia) Harrison Voight	Ducati Panigale V4 R	24 February 2024
Supercars	1:30.9508	(New Zealand) Scott McLaughlin	Ford Mustang GT	14 April 2019
Formula 4	1:31.0265	(Australia) Noah Killion	Tatuus F4-T421	16 August 2025
Porsche Carrera Cup	1:31.0850	(Australia) Kobi Williams	Porsche 911 (991 II) GT3 Cup	28 March 2026
World SSP	1:31.271	(Italy) Yari Montella	Ducati Panigale V2	24 February 2024
Super2 Series	1:32.3013	(Australia) Garry Jacobson	Ford FG X Falcon	16 April 2016
250cc Grand Prix	1:32.710	(Spain) Álvaro Bautista	Aprilia RSV 250	5 October 2008
500cc Grand Prix	1:32.743	(United States) Kenny Roberts, Jr.	Suzuki RGV500	3 October 1999
Trans-Am Australia	1:33.2185	(Australia) Jordan Boys	Ford Mustang Trans-Am	14 April 2024
V8 Touring Car National Series	1:33.2611	(Australia) Garry Jacobson	Ford FG Falcon	10 September 2016
Nations Cup	1:34.1058	(Australia) Paul Stokell	Lamborghini Diablo GTR	10 August 2003
Marque Sports	1:34.4309	(Australia) Steve Owen	Lamborghini Gallardo	21 November 2009
GT4	1:34.4397	(Australia) Tom Hayman	McLaren Artura GT4	14 April 2024
Australian Supersport	1:34.682	(Australia) Jonathan Nahlous	Yamaha YZF-R6	24 February 2024
Toyota Racing Series	1:34.7065	(Australia) Christopher Slusarski	Toyota FT-50	25 November 2023
Moto3	1:35.323	(Spain) Álvaro Carpe	KTM RC250GP	19 October 2025
Formula Ford	1:35.8901	(Australia) Anton de Pasquale	Mygale SJ13a	24 November 2013
TCR Touring Car	1:36.5159	(Australia) Brad Harris	Honda Civic Type R TCR (FL5)	14 April 2024
Mustang Cup	1:36.9173	(Australia) Cameron McLeod	Ford Mustang Dark Horse R	29 March 2026
125cc Grand Prix	1:36.927	(Spain) Álvaro Bautista	Aprilia RS125R	17 September 2006
Super Touring	1:37.1706	(Australia) Geoff Brabham	BMW 320i	1 June 1997
Sidecar F1	1:38.726	(United Kingdom) Steve Webster/ (United Kingdom) David James	LCR-Suzuki GSX-R1000	18 April 1999
Group A	1:38.8618	(Australia) Jonathon Webb	Ford Sierra RS500 Cosworth	12 March 2022
Group 3J Improved Production Cars	1:39.3958	(Australia) Adam Poole	Holden Monaro	26 November 2023
Group 3E Series Production Cars	1:42.3361	(Australia) Ryan Simpson	Lotus Exige 350 Sport	4 November 2018
Australian Mini Challenge	1:44.1491	(Australia) Paul Stokell	Mini John Cooper Works Challenge	12 September 2008
Aussie Racing Cars	1:44.884	(Australia) Joel Heinrich	Ford Mustang (S197)	7 September 2024
Sidecar F2	1:45.986	(Australia) Terry Goldie/ (Australia) Jamie Crass	LCR-Honda CBR 600	27 May 2018
Supersport 300	1:46.529	(Czech Republic) Petr Svoboda	Kawasaki Ninja 400	25 February 2024
Porsche 944	1:47.1928	(Australia) Adam Mills	Porsche 944	20 September 2015
V8 Ute Racing Series	1:48.6431	(Australia) Kim Jane	Holden VE SS Ute	16 April 2016
Toyota 86 Racing Series	1:50.9527	(Australia) Toby Dvorak	Toyota 86	23 June 2024
Formula Vee	1:51.3859	(Australia) Mitch Quiddington	Sabre 02	27 October 2013
Circuit Excel Racing	1:57.6708	(Australia) Ethan Grigg-Gault	Hyundai Excel	3 March 2024
Oceania Junior Cup	2:09.416	(Australia) Haydn Fordyce	Yamaha YZF-R15	29 October 2023
Grand Prix Circuit (1952–1978): 4.800 km (2.983 mi)
Group A (Australia)	1:47.900	(Australia) John Harvey	McLaren M6B	30 January 1972
Group 4	1:51.900	(Australia) Alan Hamilton	Porsche 906P	30 January 1972
Formula Two	1:56.000	(Australia) Maurie Quincey	Elfin 600B	24 January 1970
