= Australian Tourist Trophy (for motorcycles) =

The Australian Tourist Trophy was a motor race for motorcycles, held in Australia from 1914.

The first Australian Tourist Trophy was held at Goulburn on Easter Monday, 13 April 1914. The most recent running of the event was at Port Kembla at Easter 1996.

== See also ==
- 1936 Australian Tourist Trophy, for the unrelated automobile race held at Phillip Island on 30 March 1936
- Australian Tourist Trophy, for the unrelated sequence of automobile races held in Australia since 1956.
