= MG KN =

MG KN Magnette
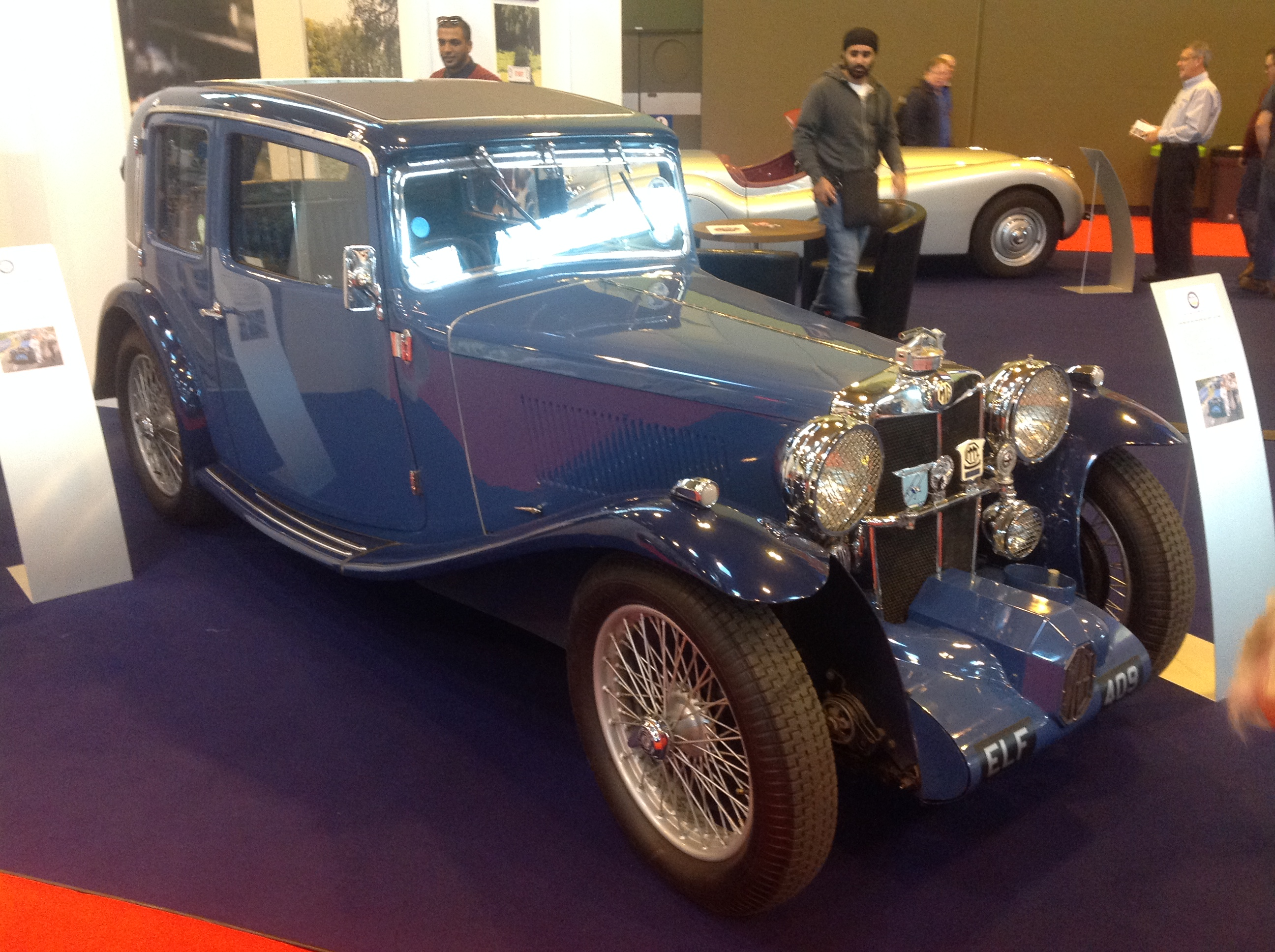
- MG KN

Overview
- Manufacturer: MG
- Production: 1933–1934
- Assembly: Abingdon-on-Thames, Berkshire, England

Body and chassis
- Body style: 4-door coupé

Powertrain
- Engine: 1271 cc I6
- Transmission: 4-speed manual

Dimensions
- Wheelbase: 108 inches (2743 mm)
- Length: 154 inches (3924 mm)
- Width: 59 inches (1499 mm)

Chronology
- Successor: MG VA

The MG KN Magnette is a coupé that was produced by MG between 1933 and 1934 and was designed to use up surplus bodies made for the unsold MG K-type saloons. These bodies were fitted to the K1 chassis but had the more powerful MG N-type 1271 cc engine.

The body had no pillar between the front and rear doors. The front doors were hinged at the windscreen end and closed against the rear doors. To give the impression of being a two-door coupé the rear doors had no external handles. The absence of the central pillar affected the structure of the body and often caused problems. A sunshine roof was fitted.

The 56 bhp engine would take the car to 78 mph.

A variation was sold by University Motors, the London MG dealer using the four-seat K1 body and called the "University Motors Speed Model".

The KN was priced at £399 when new.

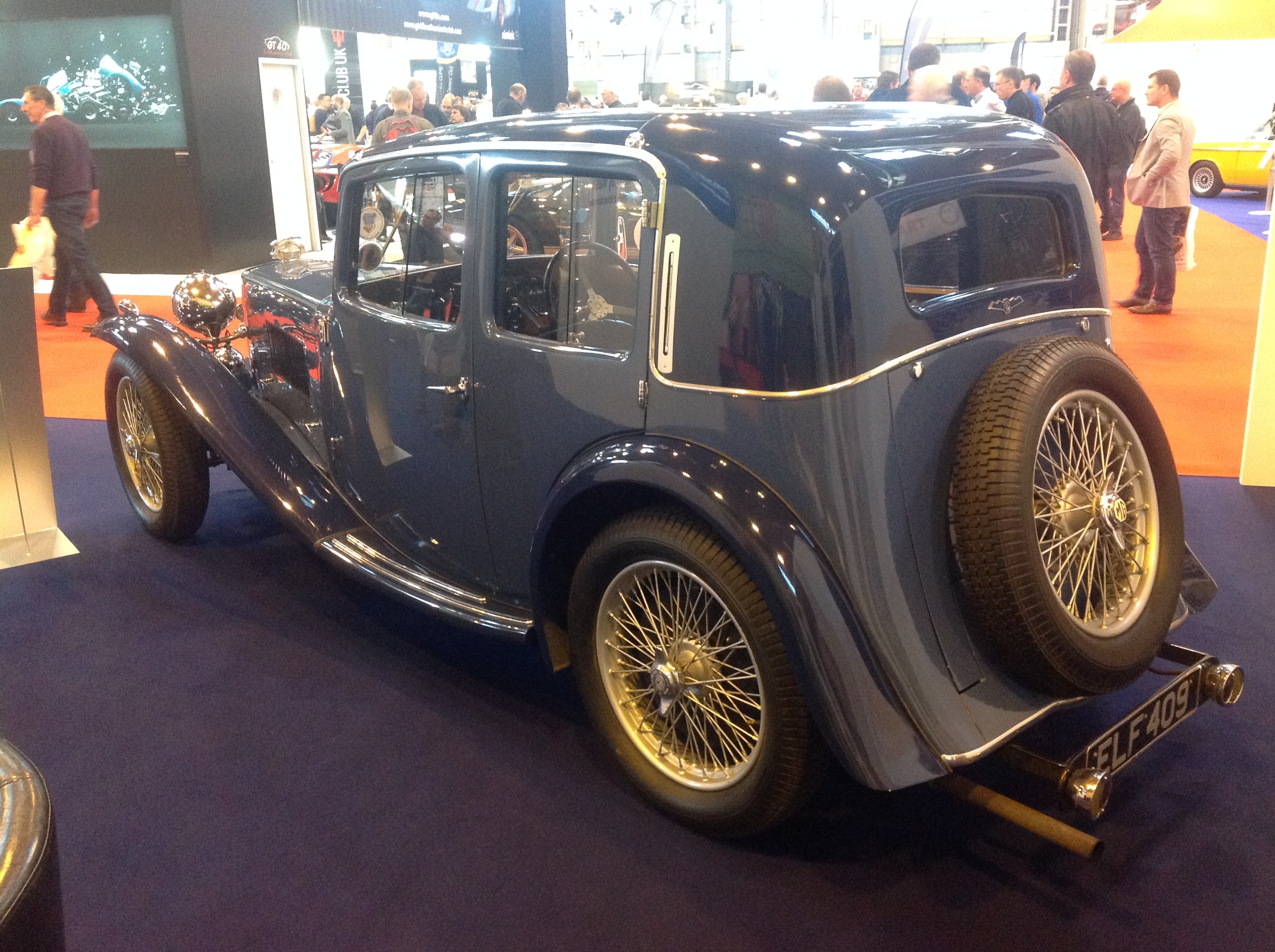
MG KN
