= MG D-type =

MG D-type "Midget"
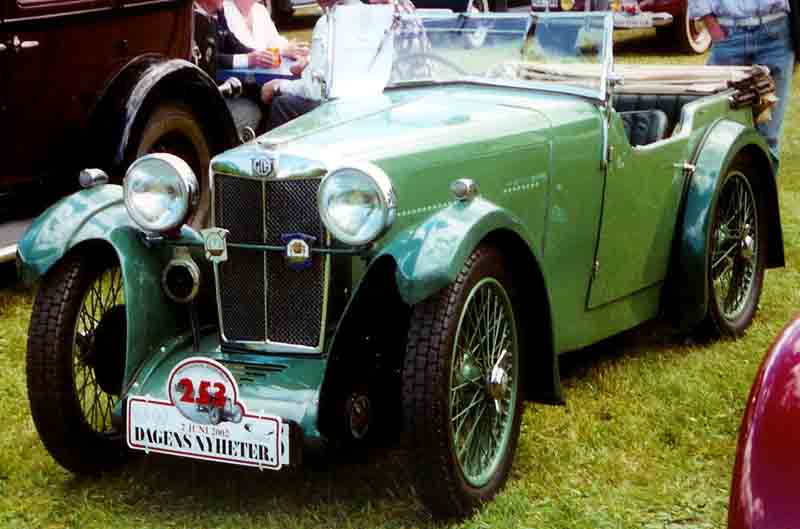

Overview
- Manufacturer: MG
- Production: 1931–1932
- Assembly: Abingdon-on-Thames, Berkshire, England

Body and chassis
- Class: sports car
- Body style: four-seat roadster four-seat Salonette
- Layout: FR layout

Powertrain
- Engine: 847 cc In-line 4

Chronology
- Predecessor: MG M-Type Midget
- Successor: MG J-Type Midget

The MG D-type (also known as the MG Midget) is a sports car that was produced by MG in 1931 and 1932. It used the engine from the MG M-type in the chassis from the MG C-type and was only available as a four-seater. Of the 250 cars produced, 208 were open tourers, 37 were salonettes and five went to external coachbuilders.

The car used the M-Type 847 cc engine that was derived from the overhead camshaft engine from the 1928 Morris Minor and Wolseley 10 with a single SU Carburettor producing 27 bhp (20 kW) at 4500 rpm. Drive was to the rear wheels through a three-speed non-synchromesh gearbox with a four-speed gearbox was an option on later cars. The chassis came from the C-Type and took the form of a ladder frame with tubular cross members and passed under the rear axle. The suspension used half-elliptic springs and Hartford friction shock absorbers with rigid front and rear axles and centre lock wire wheels, the brakes were cable operated with 8 in (203 mm)) drums. At 84 in (2,134 mm)), 86 in (2,184 mm)) after the first 100 cars, the wheelbase was longer than the C-Type to cater for the larger body, but the track remained the same at 42 in (1,067 mm)).

In spite of its looks the car was not very fast, 60 mph (97 km/h) being just possible in the tourer, the body being really too much for the small engine. The cars are quite rare today, many having been converted into C-Type replicas. At the same time as the D-Type was being made MG was also offering the 6-cylinder 1271 cc F-Type, and externally the two are virtually identical. The extra power of the F-Type made it a much better car, and it proved a bigger seller.

== Gallery ==
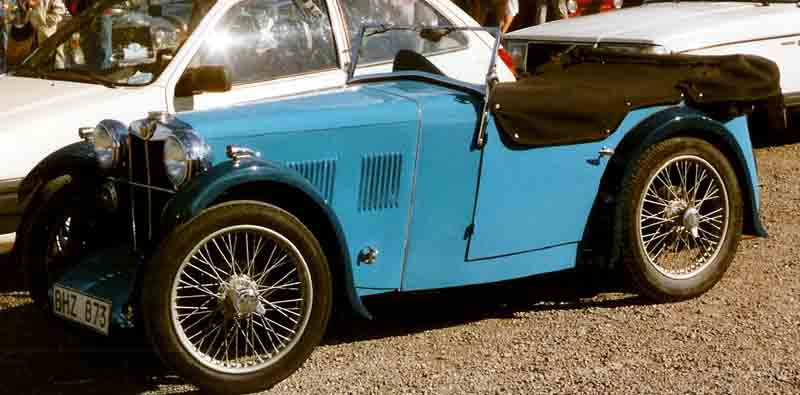
MG D-Type 4-Seater Tourer 1931

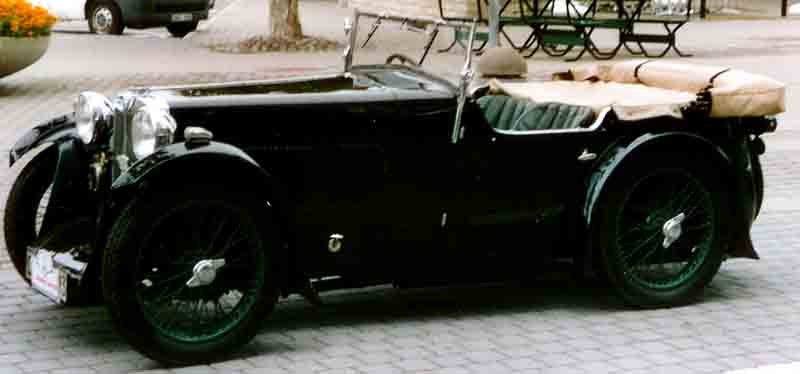
MG D-Type 4-Seater Tourer 1932

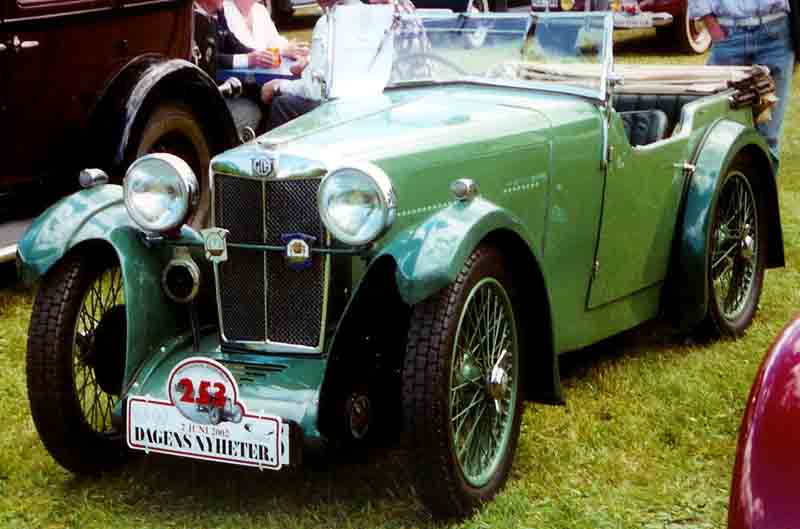
MG D-Type 4-Seater Tourer 1932

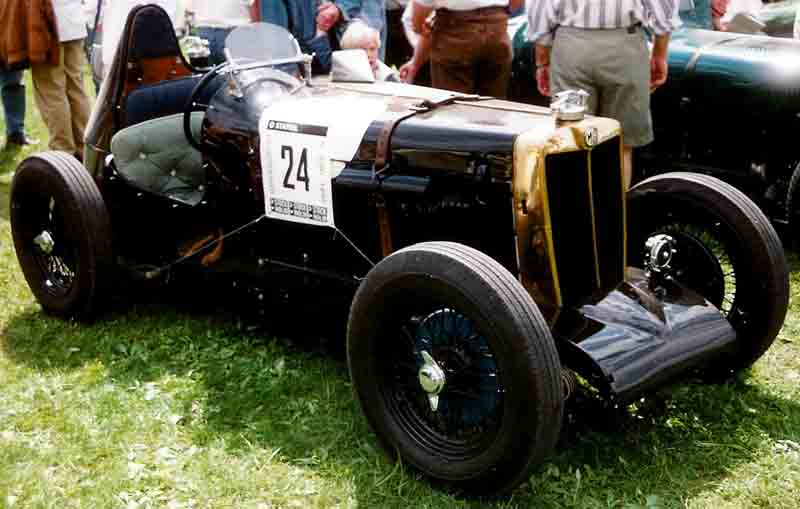
MG D-Type Special Racer 1932
