= MG K-type =

MG K-Type "Magnette"

Overview
- Manufacturer: MG
- Production: 1932–1934 approx 250 units
- Assembly: Abingdon-on-Thames, Berkshire, England

Body and chassis
- Class: open tourer sports car racing car

Chronology
- Predecessor: MG F-Type Magna
- Successor: MG N-Type Magnette

The MG K-type Magnette is a motor car produced in the United Kingdom by MG from October 1932 to 1934.

Launched at the 1932 London Motor Show, the K-Type replaced the F-Type Magna but having at first a slightly smaller capacity engine it took the name Magnette. The chassis was similar to the Magna but strengthened and had the track increased by 6 inches (150 mm) to 48 inches (1,200 mm) and was available in two lengths with a wheelbase of either 94 inches (2,400 mm) or 108 inches (2,700 mm). The steering was modified with a patented divided track rod which was claimed to reduce kick back at the steering wheel. The brakes were cable operated with 13-inch (330 mm) drums made of "Elektron", a light magnesium alloy, with shrunk in steel liners. Suspension by half-elliptic springs and Hartford friction shock absorbers all round with rigid front and rear axles. Wire wheels with 4.75 x 19 tyres and centre lock fixing were used.

The engines were based on a Wolseley overhead camshaft design used first in the 1930 Wolseley Hornet and subsequently used by MG in the F-Type but subject to a major re-design. The stroke was reduced from 83 mm to 71 mm to reduce the capacity from 1272 cc to 1087 cc and a cross flow cylinder head fitted. Fitted at first with triple SU carburetors it produced 39 bhp (29 kW) at 5500 rpm. In early 1933 a modified version of the engine was announced that had improved valve timing and only two carburettors but the output was up at 41 bhp (31 kW). This engine was called the KB and the previous version, which continued in use, the KA. In late 1933 they were joined by the KD with a larger 1271 cc capacity by returning to the F-Type stroke of 83 mm but with the improved cylinder head and timing power was up to 48.5 bhp (36.2 kW). (The F-Type had only been rated at 37 bhp.) In addition there was the KC engine for the racing cars. This retained the 1087 cc capacity but with the aid of a supercharger power was up at 120 bhp (89 kW) at 6500 rpm.

Drive was to the rear wheels through either a four-speed non-synchromesh gearbox or ENV made pre-selector type.

All the road cars were capable of reaching 75 mph (121 km/h).

== K1 ==
MG K1
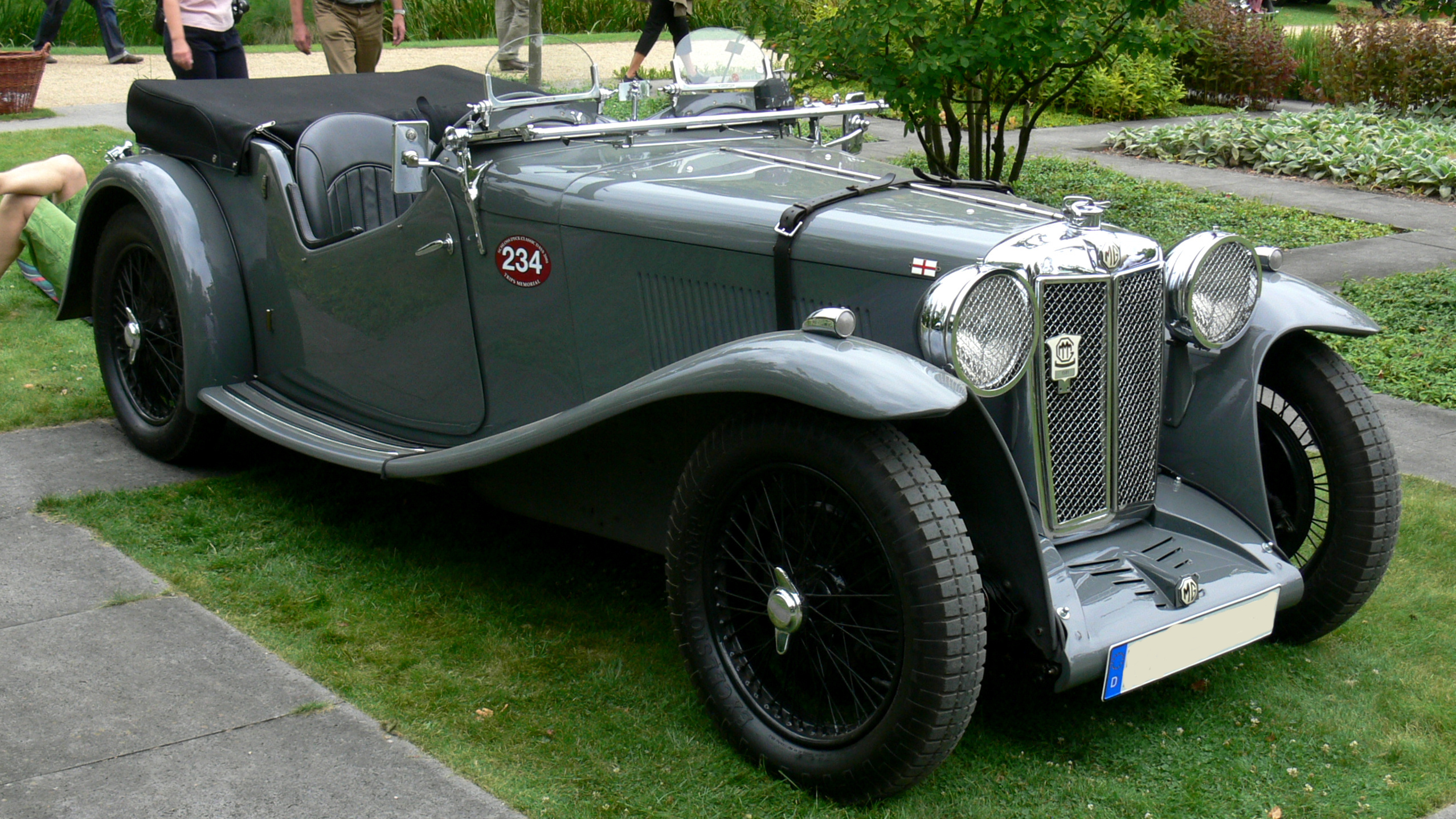

Overview
- Production: 1932–1934; 181 units

Body and chassis
- Body style: 4-seat open tourer 4-door pillarless saloon

Powertrain
- Engine: Straight-6 1087 cc

This was the original K having the long chassis and was first shown with the saloon body, KA engine and pre-selector gearbox all costing £445, quite expensive at the time. It was soon joined by a tourer with KB engine and manual gearbox. Later the saloon could also be had with KD engine and pre-selector.

54 K1s with KA engines, 74 with KB engines and 53 with KDs were made. Not many of the saloons were sold and surplus bodies/chassis were later fitted with MG "N" type engines and sold as the MG KN Magnette.

== K2 ==
MG K2

Overview
- Production: 1933–1934; 20 units

Body and chassis
- Body style: 2-seat open tourer

Powertrain
- Engine: 1087/1271 cc n-line 6

The K2 was the open 2-seater and so had the shorter chassis. It had at first the KB engine and manual box but later cars could have the larger KD with preselector gearbox.

16 were made with KB engines and a further 4 with KD engines.

== K3 ==
MG K3
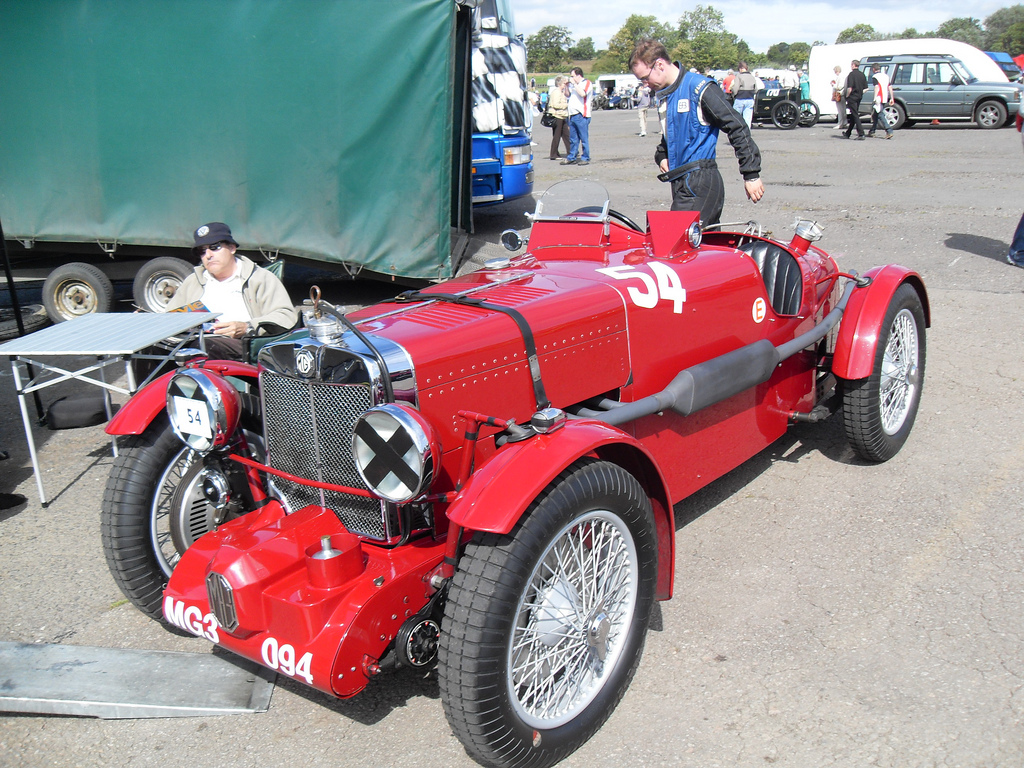

Overview
- Production: 1933–1934; 33 units

Body and chassis
- Body style: 2-seat sports/racer

Powertrain
- Engine: 1087 cc In-line 6 supercharged

The K3 was the racing variant and used the short chassis. The KC engine at first used a Powerplus supercharger replaced later by a Marshall-made one. They were prominently mounted in front of the engine below the radiator. Preselector gearboxes were used. They were successfully raced in 1933, winning the 1100 cc class in the Mille Miglia driven by Capt. George Eyston and Count Lurani and scoring an outright victory (on handicap) in the Ulster RAC Tourist Trophy (TT) race where the car was driven by Tazio Nuvolari at an average speed of 78.65 m.p.h. The K3's greatest international success came in the 1934 24 Hours of Le Mans, when chassis # K3027 finished 4th overall and won the Index of Performance, as driven by Roy Eccles and C.E.C. "Charlie" Martin. This car is on display at the Simeone Foundation Automotive Museum in Philadelphia, Pennsylvania. The K3 attracted the great names of the racing world – Sir Tim Birkin of Bentley fame, Whitney Straight and 'Hammy' Hamilton. Only 33 were made and as well as the works cars they could be bought for £795 but subsequently quite a few replicas have been made often from the K1 and K2 models. The K3 raced well into the post-war period, and many of the cars did not survive intact. A car-by-car analysis shows that most of them had new bodies, engine changes, or were destroyed.

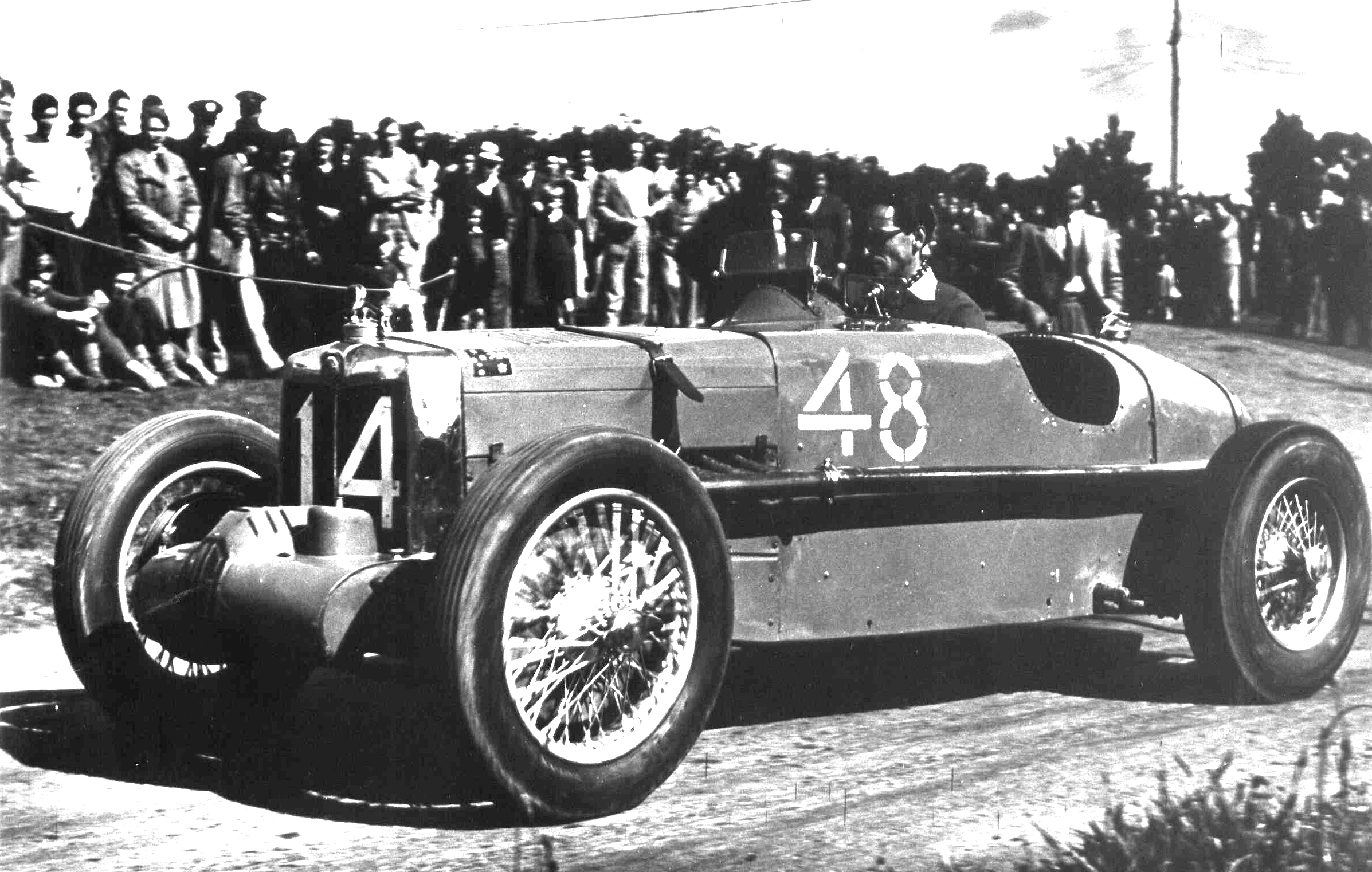
John Barraclough won the 1949 Australian Hillclimb Championship at Rob Roy driving a K3 Magnette
