= MG F-type =

MG F-Type "Magna"

Overview
- Manufacturer: MG
- Production: 1931–1932; 1,250 built
- Assembly: Abingdon-on-Thames, Berkshire, England

Body and chassis
- Class: sports car

Chronology
- Predecessor: none
- Successor: MG L-type Magna

MG F1

Overview
- Production: 1931–1932

Body and chassis
- Body style: 4-seat open tourer Foursome Coupé

Powertrain
- Engine: 1271 cc In-line 6

MG F2
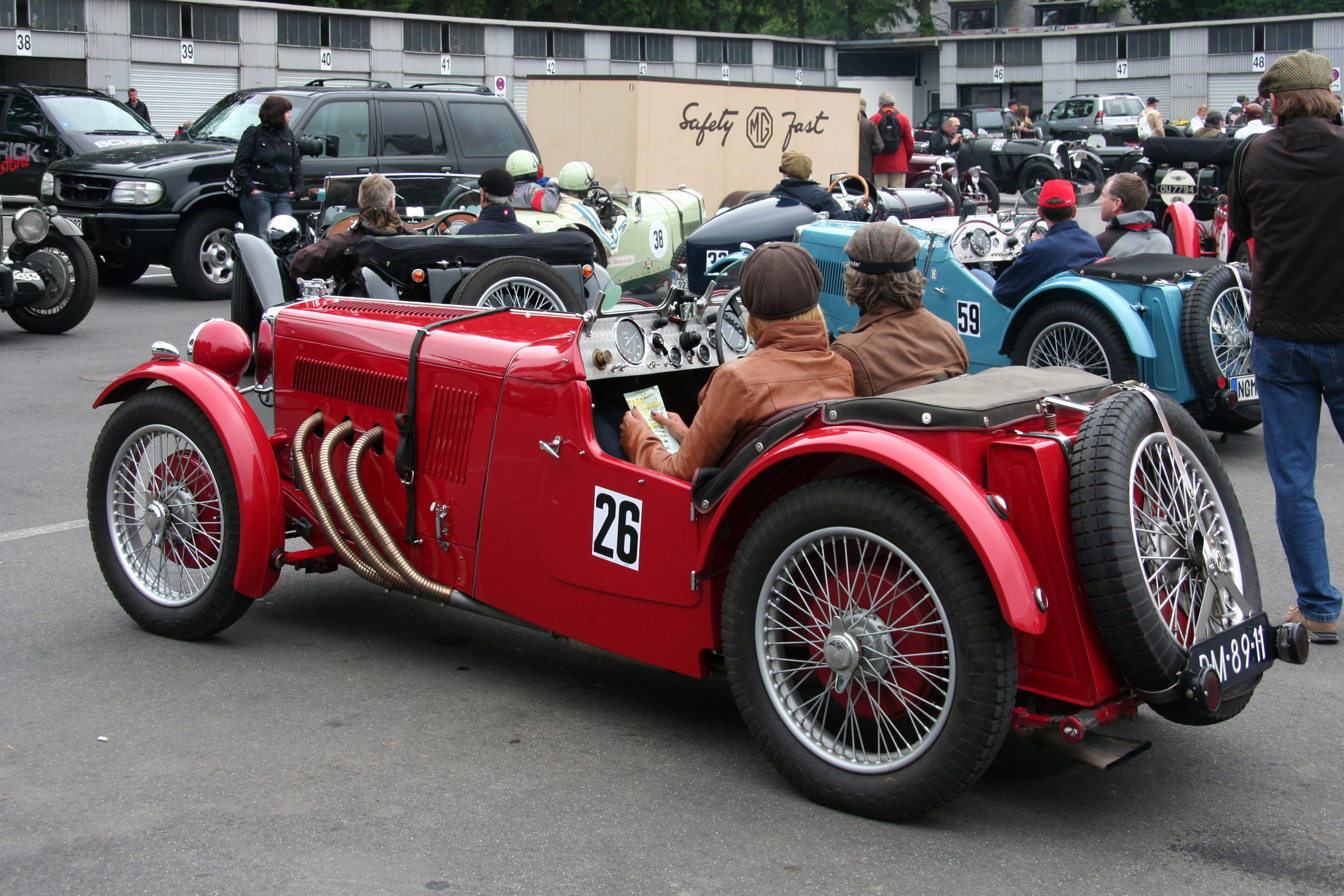

Overview
- Production: 1932

Body and chassis
- Body style: 2-seat open tourer

Powertrain
- Engine: 1271 cc In-line 6

MG F3

Overview
- Production: 1932

Body and chassis
- Body style: 4-seat open tourer Foursome Coupé

Powertrain
- Engine: 1271 cc In-line 6

The MG F-type (also known as the MG Magna) is a six-cylinder-engined car that was produced by MG from October 1931 to 1932. It was also known as the 12/70.

Looking for a car to fill the gap between the M-Type Midget and the 18/80, MG turned to another of the engines that had become available from William Morris's acquisition of Wolseley. This was the 1271 cc 6-cylinder version of the overhead camshaft engine used in the 1929 MG M type Midget and previously seen in the 1930 Wolseley Hornet and had dummy side covers to disguise its origins. Fitted with 1 in (25 mm) twin SU carburettors it produced 37.2 bhp (27.7 kW) at 4100 rpm at first, later increased to 47 bhp (35 kW) by revising the valve timing. Drive was to the rear wheels through a four-speed non-synchromesh gearbox of ENV manufacture. The chassis was a 10-inch (250 mm) longer version of the one from the MG D-type with suspension by half-elliptic springs and Hartford friction shock absorbers all round with rigid front and rear axles. Wire wheels with 4.00 x 19 tyres and centre lock fixing were used. The car had a wheelbase of 94 in (2,388 mm) and a track of 42 in (1,067 mm).

With its sloping radiator and long bonnet, the F-Type is capable of reaching 70 mph (110 km/h). 188 of the cars were supplied in chassis form to outside coachbuilders such as Abbey, Jarvis, Stiles and Windover.

== MG F ==
The original F was restricted by only having 8-inch (200 mm) brake drums, which, with its 4-seat bodies, was not really adequate. Many F1 cars have subsequently been fitted with the larger F2 brakes.

The four-seat tourer cost £250 and the Foursome coupé cost £289.

== MG F2 ==
Introduced in late 1932 the F2 was the open 2-seater car in the range. It also got much needed enhanced braking by fitting larger 12-inch (300 mm) drums all round. The body with straight-topped doors came from the J-Type Midget.

== MG F3 ==
The F3, also introduced in 1932, used the same brakes as the F2 but had the 4-seater tourer and Foursome Coupé bodies fitted. The engine cooling was improved by changing the cooling water flow.

== See also ==
- 1936 Benalla Centenary Race
