= MG P-type =

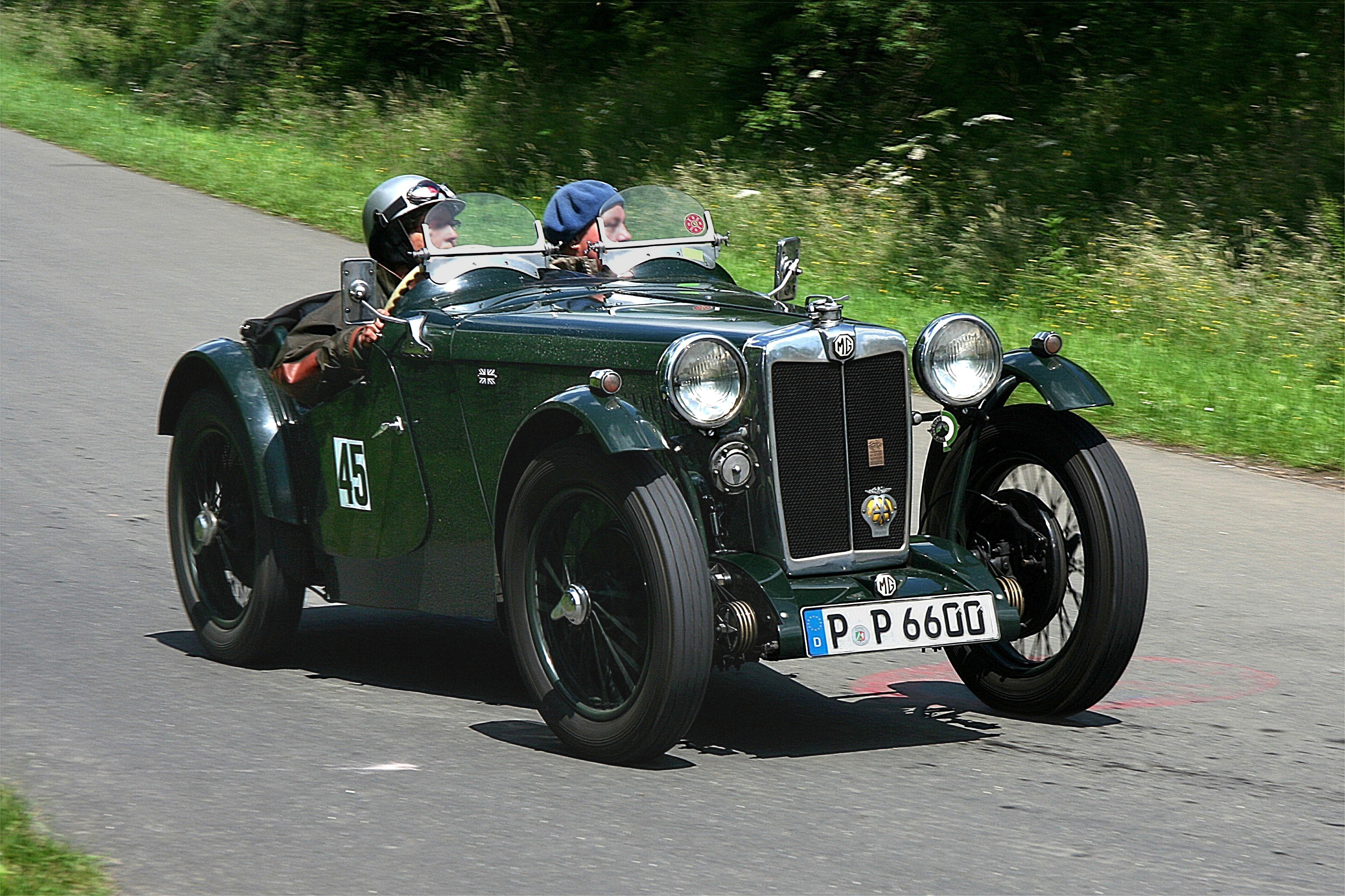
- PA open two-seater, 1934

Overview
- Manufacturer: MG
- Production: 1934–1936
- Assembly: Abingdon-on-Thames, Berkshire, England

Body and chassis
- Class: Sports car
- Body style: 2-door roadster Airline coupé

Powertrain
- Engine: 847 cc (51.7 cu in) I4; 939 cc (57.3 cu in) I4

Dimensions
- Wheelbase: 87.25 in (2,216 mm)
- Length: 131 in (3,327 mm)
- Width: 52.5 in (1,334 mm)

Chronology
- Predecessor: J-type Midget
- Successor: TA

The MG P-type is a sports car that was produced by MG from 1934 to 1936. This 2-door sports car used an updated version of the Wolseley Motors-designed and made overhead camshaft, crossflow engine, used in the 1928 Morris Minor and previously fitted in the J-type Midget of 1932 to 1934, driving the rear wheels through a four-speed non-synchromesh gearbox. The chassis was a strengthened, slightly longer version of that used in the J-type, with suspension by half-elliptic springs all round and rigid front and rear axles. Steering was initially by a Marles Weller and later a Bishop Cam system. The two-seat car had a wheelbase of 87 inches (2210 mm) and a track of 42 in (1,100 mm). Most cars were open two-seaters, but streamlined Airline coupé bodies were also made. The P-type was also available as a four-seater, a car that suffered from a lack of power and poor rear ground clearance. Whereas J, K and L-type MGs differentiated between versions with the use of numbers, with 1 indicating a four-seater (i.e., J1) and 2 a two-seater (i.e., J2), this was not the case with the P-type (or its six-cylinder sister, the N-type Magnette), and there is no clue to the type in the name.

== MG PA ==
The first PA used an 847 cc (51.7 cu in) engine similar to the J-Type's, now with a 3-bearing crankshaft, improved camshaft, and twin OM-model SU carburettors. It produced 36 bhp (27 kW) at 5,500 rpm, allowing a top speed of approximately 74 mph (119 km/h), and a 0–50 mph (80 km/h) time of 20 seconds. In 1935, a two-seater roadster cost £222. 1,973 PAs were made, 27 of which were eventually converted to PBs.

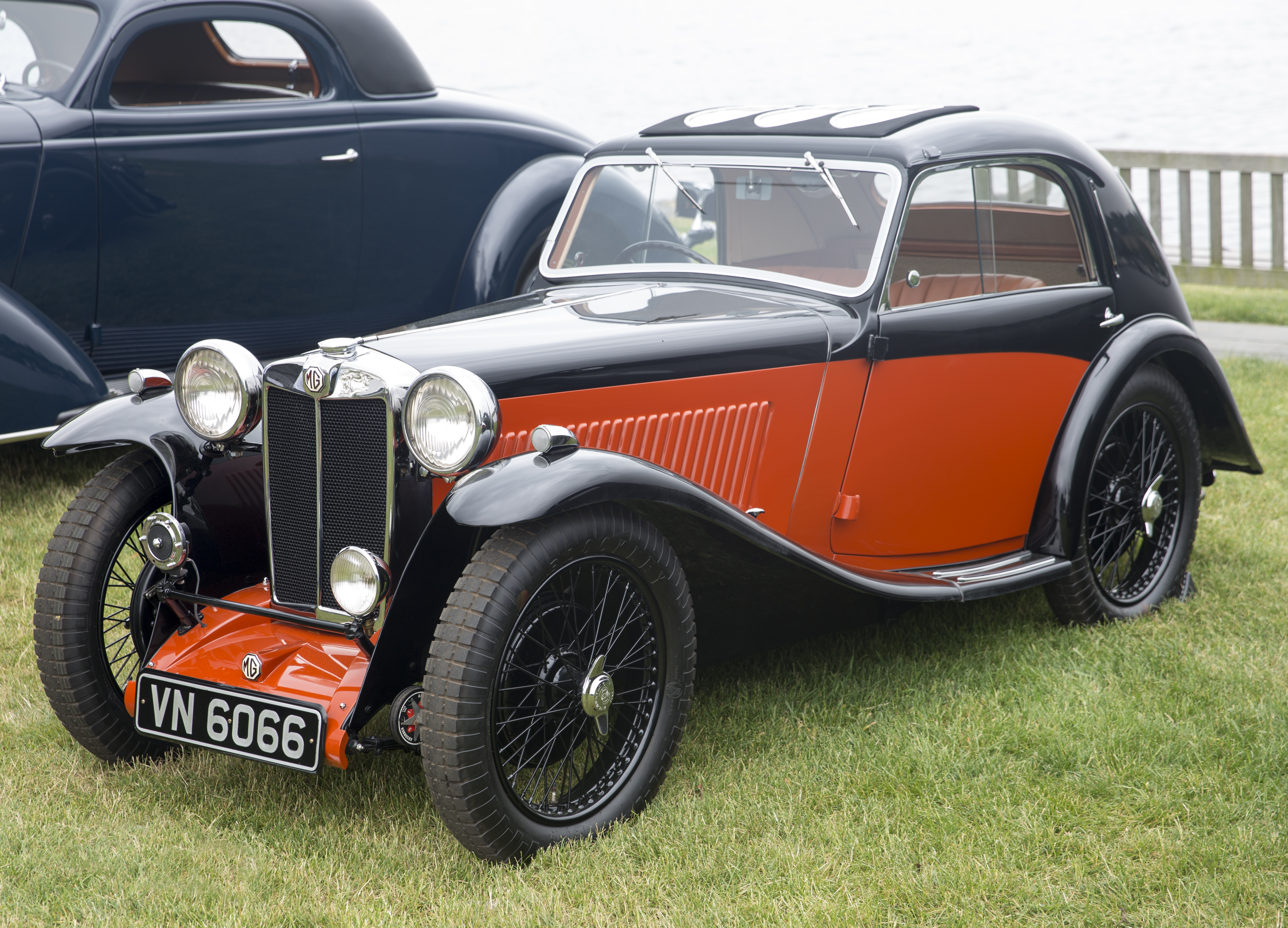
1934 PA Airline Coupé

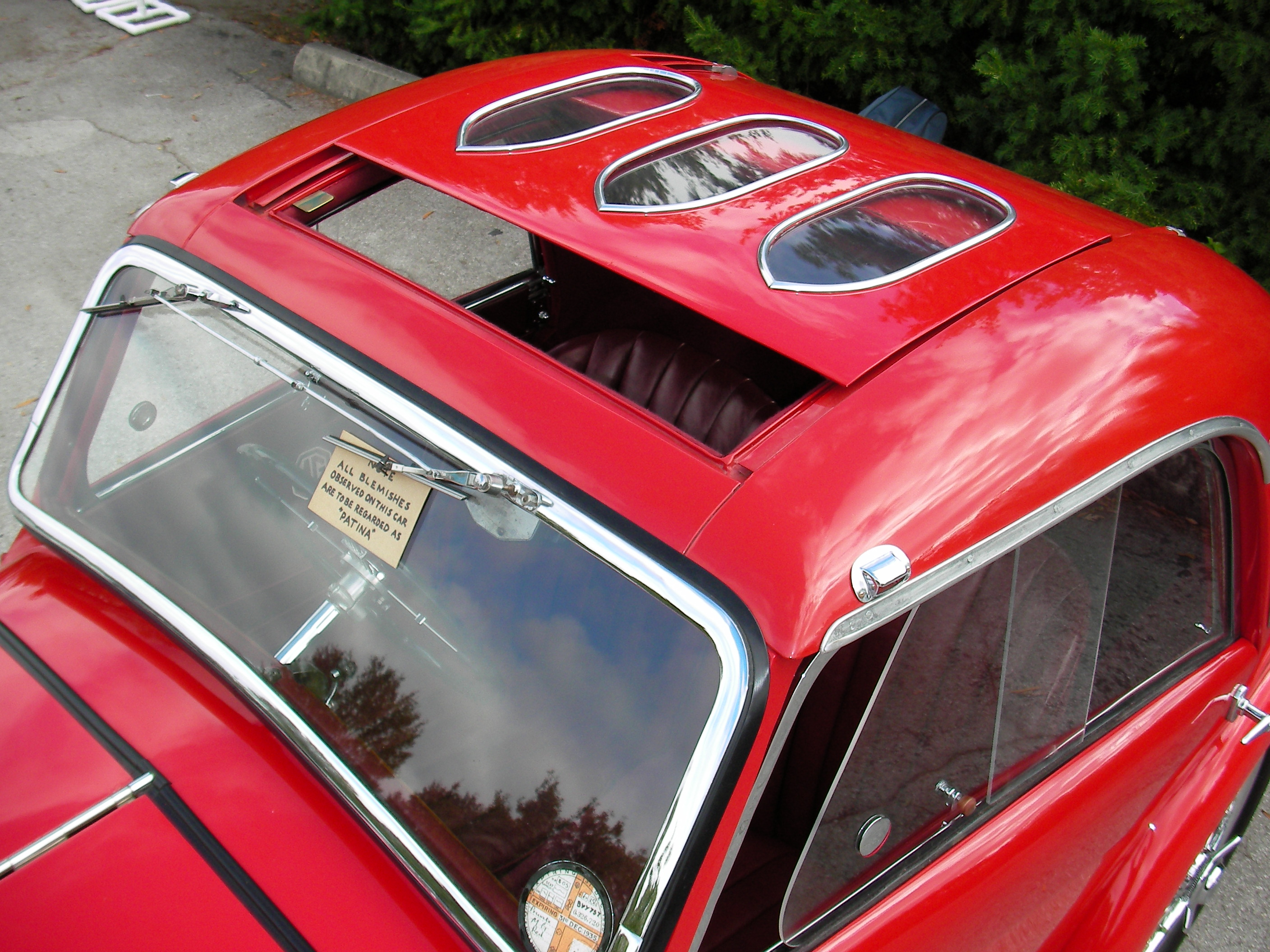
Sliding head

== MG PB ==
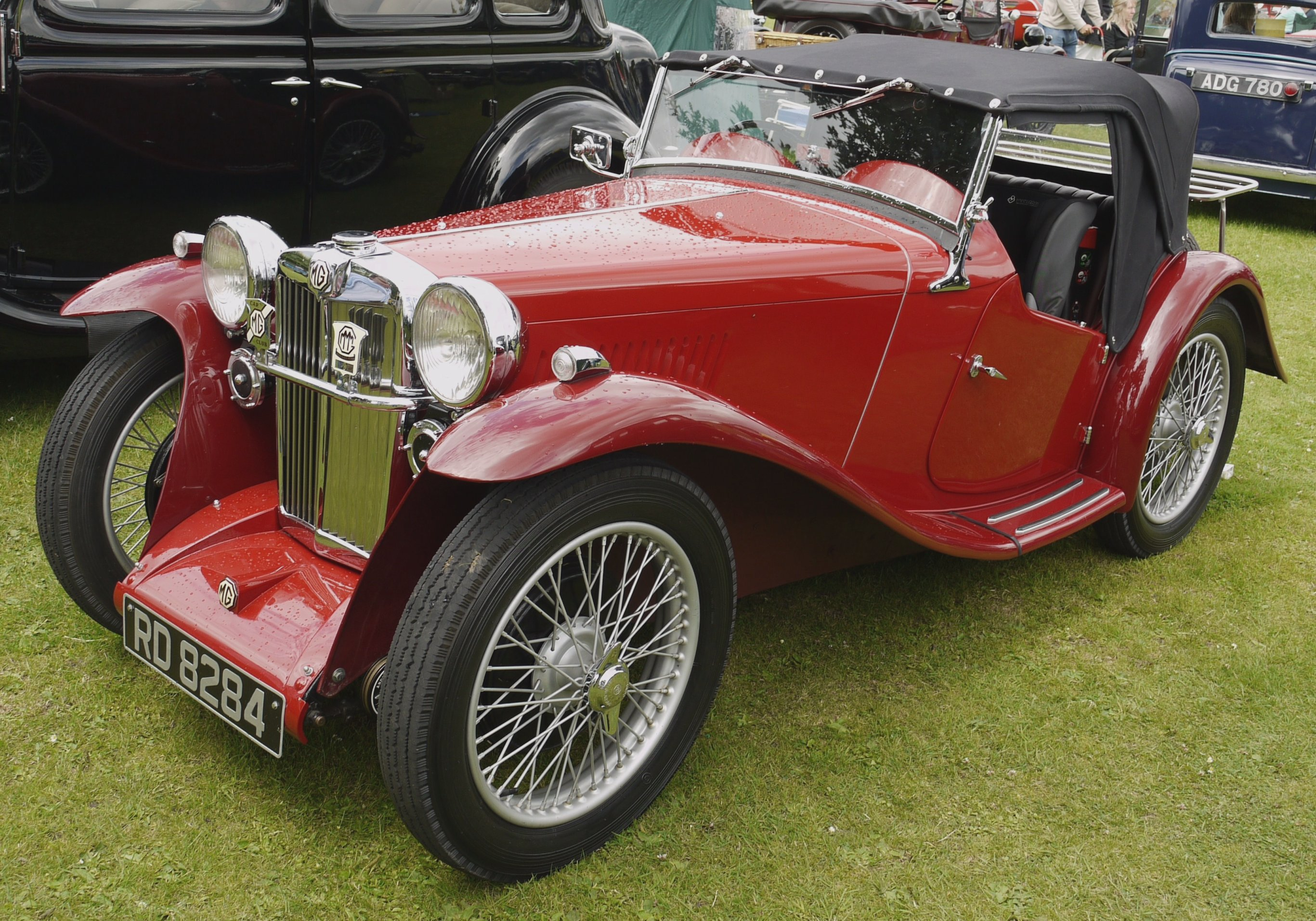
1936 MG PB

The PB was produced from 1935 to 1936. It had a bigger 939 cc (57.3 cu in) engine, made by enlarging the bore from 57 to 60 mm, which increased output to 43 bhp (32 kW). Externally very similar to the PA, the main differences in the PB are a vertically slatted radiator grille in place of a honeycomb, and the design and material of the standard dashboard.

526 examples of the PB were produced.

In 1936 a supercharged MG PB driven by Andrew Hutchinson won the Limerick Grand Prix.
