= 1934 Australian Grand Prix =

The 1934 Australian Grand Prix was a motor race held at the Phillip Island circuit in Victoria, Australia on 19 March 1934. The 200 mile race, which was organised by the Light Car Club of Australia, was the seventh Australian Grand Prix. Contested as a handicap race, it was won by Bob Lea-Wright, driving a Singer Nine.

== Race classification ==
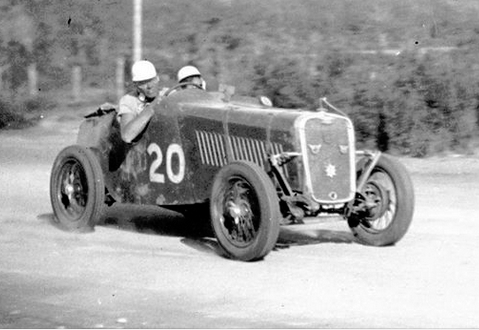
Bob Lea-Wright driving his Singer Nine to victory in the 1934 Australian Grand Prix

| Position | Driver | No. | Car | Entrant | Handicap | Laps |
| 1 | Bob Lea-Wright | 20 | Singer Nine | Lea-Wright Motors | 35 minutes | 31 |
| 2 | Bill Thompson | 2 | MG K3 Magnette | R Lane | Scratch | 31 |
| 3 | Jack Clements | 22 | MG J2 Midget | J Clements | 35 minutes | 31 |
| 4 | Les Jennings | 9 | MG Magna | L Jennings | 15 minutes | 31 |
| 5 | Harold Drake Richmond | 12 | Bugatti Type 37 | H Drake Richmond | 17 minutes | 31 |
| 6 | Cec Warren | 6 | MG J2 Midget | Britannia Motors P/L | 12 minutes | 31 |
| NC | Arthur Terdich | 3 | Bugatti Type 37A | AJ Terdich | 4 minutes | 29 |
| NC | Barnie Dentry | 7 | Riley Brooklands | GB Dentry | 13 minutes | 28 |
| DNF | Geoff Disher | 16 | Salmson L Type | G Disher | 19 minutes | 28 |
| DNF | Neil Gullifer | 15 | Ballot | N Gullifer | 18 minutes | 28 |
| DNF | R Anderson | 10 | MG Magna | R Anderson | 15 minutes | 20 |
| DNF | Les Murphy | 21 | MG J2 Midget | L Murphy | 35 minutes | 14 |
| DNF | Johnny Summers | 8 | MG Magna | JH Summers | 14 minutes | 13 |
| DNF | Bill Williamson | 19 | Riley 9 | JW Williamson | 32 minutes | 10 |
| DNF | Ernie Nichols | 11 | Bugatti Type 37 | E Nichols | 15 minutes | 8 |
| DNF | Jack McCutcheon | 5 | Bugatti Type 37 | K MacMeikan | 15 minutes | 7 |
| DNF | R Johnstone | 14 | Lombard | HWH Lowe | 17 minutes | 6 |
| DNF | Arthur Wylie | 13 | Bugatti Type 37 | AJ Wylie | 17 minutes | 3 |
| DNF | Norman Putt | 18 | MG K1 Magnette | Britannia Motors P/L | 20 minutes | 3 |
| DNF | Ken McKinney | 17 | Austin 7 | K McKinney | 20 minutes | 1 |
| DNS | Jack Edwards | 4 | Bugatti Type 30 | AC Smith | - | - |

Of the twenty starters, six completed the course within the prescribed time limit.

Key:

- NC: Not classified
- DNF: Did not finish
- DNS: Did not start

Notes:

- Race distance: 31 laps, 206 miles, 321.8 kilometres (200.0 mi)
- Winner's race time: 3 hours 12 minutes 10 seconds (63.5 miles per hour (102.2 km/h))
- Winning margin: 24 seconds
- Fastest lap: Bill Thompson, 4 minutes 43 seconds (84 miles per hour (135 km/h))
- Fastest time: Bill Thompson, 2 hours 37 minutes and 21 seconds (Thompson was awarded the prize for the "Fastest time", this being actual running time, ignoring handicap.)

| Preceded by 1933 Australian Grand Prix | Australian Grand Prix; 1934 | Succeeded by 1935 Australian Grand Prix |
