= 1935 Australian Grand Prix =

Motor race at Phillip Island

The 1935 Australian Grand Prix was a motor race held at the Phillip Island circuit in Victoria, Australia on 1 April 1935. The 200 mile race was organised by the Light Car Club of Australia and was open to cars with an engine capacity not exceeding 2000cc. It was the eighth Australian Grand Prix and the last to be staged at the Phillip Island circuit.

Contested as a handicap race, it was won by Les Murphy, driving an MG P Type. Murphy started the race 29 minutes and 27 seconds ahead of the last starter, Bill Thompson, who finished second. Murphy's winning margin was 27 seconds. Thompson completed the race in the fastest actual time and set the fastest lap of the race.

== Race classification ==
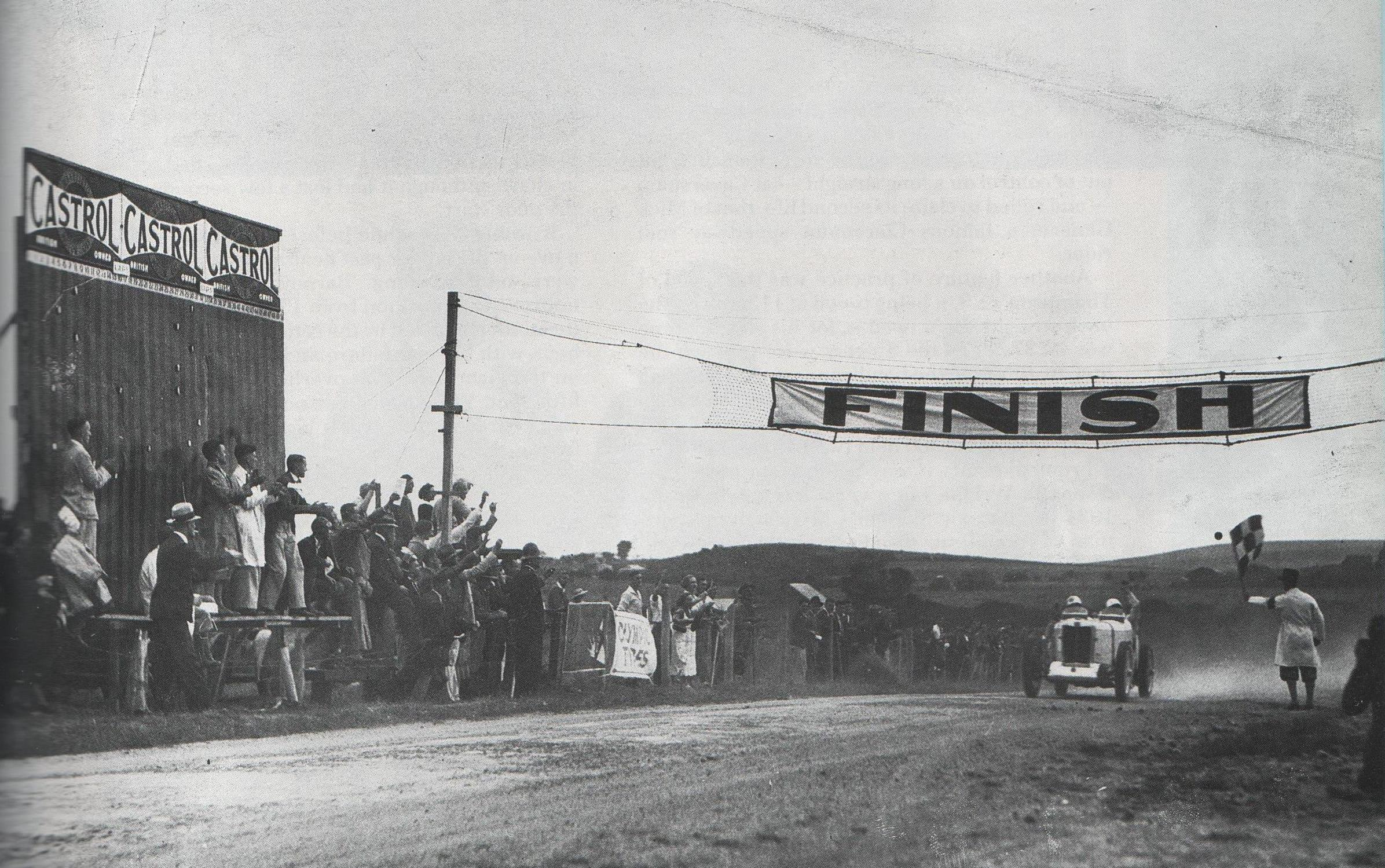
Les Murphy (MG P Type) takes the flag to win the 1935 Australian Grand Prix

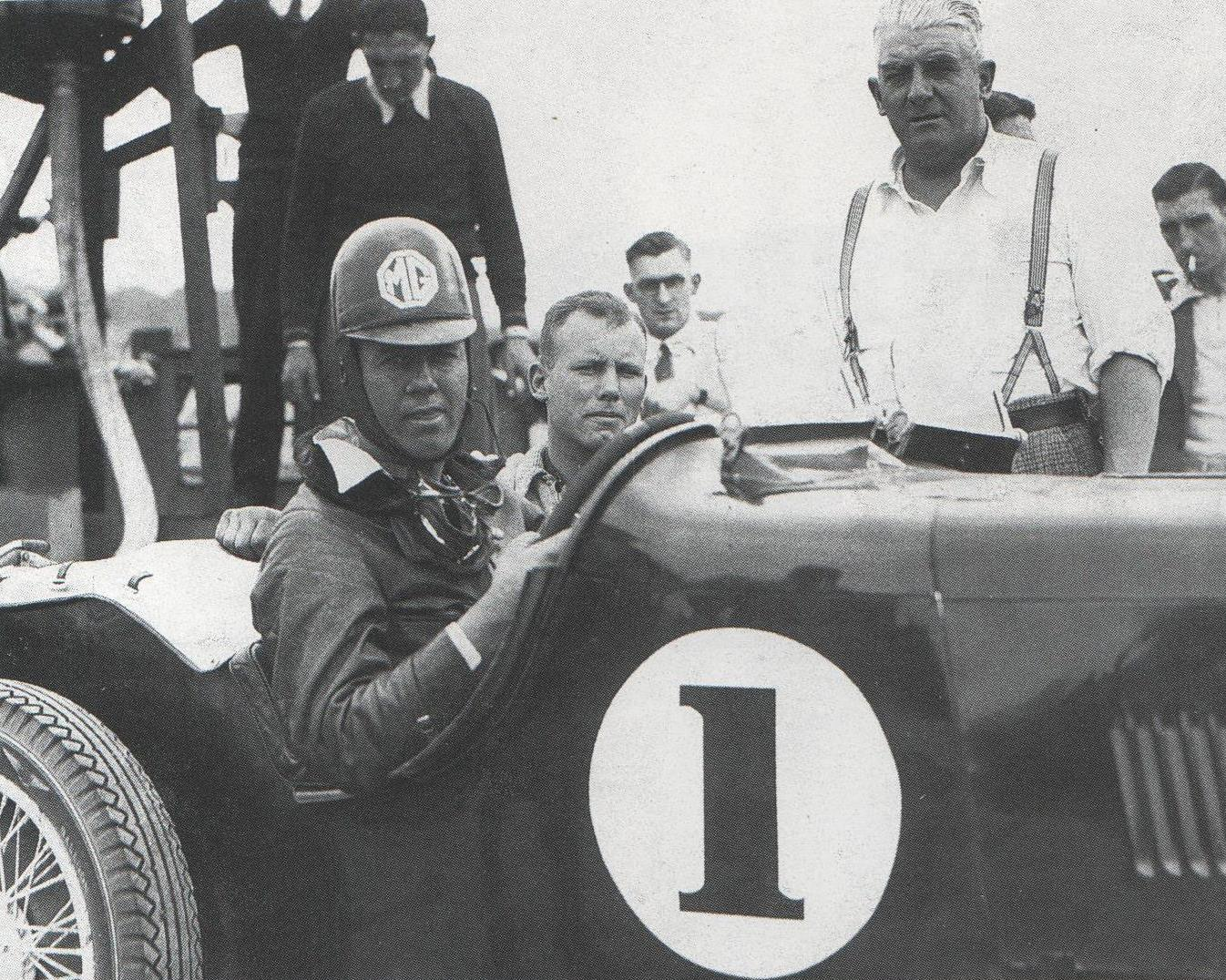
Bill Thompson placed second, having set the fastest actual time and the fastest lap of the race in an MG K3 Magnette

| Position | Driver | No. | Car | Entrant | Handicap | Laps |
| 1 | Les Murphy | 12 | MG P Type | L Murphy | 29:27 | 31 |
| 2 | Bill Thompson | 1 | MG K3 Magnette | RT Lane | Scratch | 31 |
| 3 | Les Jennings | 5 | MG Magna | L Jennings | 15:30 | 31 |
| 4 | Roy McKay | 14 | MG P Type | R McKay | 33:35 | 31 |
| 5 | Barney Dentry | 3 | Riley Special | GB Dentry | 8:47 | 31 |
| 6 | Tom Hollinrake | 9 | MG J3 | H Randall | 23:15 | 31 |
| 7 | Ernie Nichols | 7 | Bugatti Type 37 | E Nicols | 21:42 | 31 |
| DNF | Colin Keefer | 15 | MG J2 | C Keefer | 33:35 | 22 |
| DNF | Bernie Horsley | 10 | MG J3 | B Horsley | 24:17 | 16 |
| DNF | Bob Lea-Wright | 18 | Singer Le Mans Sports | RA Lea-Wright | 34:37 | 15 |
| DNF | Jack Sidebottom | 17 | Singer Le Mans Sports | J Sidebottom | 34:37 | 11 |
| DNF | Harold Drake-Richmond | 6 | Bugatti Type 37 | H Drake-Richmond | 20:40 | 8 |
| DNF | Bill Williamson | 2 | Riley Imp | BL Cohen | 8:47 | 8 |
| DNF | Jack McCutcheon | 4 | Bugatti Type 37 | K MacMeikan | 12:56 | 5 |
| DNF | Merton Wreford | 11 | Riley Brooklands | BL Cohen | 26:52 | 4 |
| DNF | Jim Skinner | 16 | MG J2 | J Skinner | 33:35 | 4 |
| DNS | Les Cramp | 8 | Ballot | L Cramp | 23:15 | - |
| DNS | Ted Miller | 19 | Diatto | T Miller | 37:12 | - |

The Team Prize was awarded to Lane's Motors which nominated Murphy, Thompson and McKay.

Key:

- DNF: Did not finish
- DNS: Did not start
- Handicap: The interval between the driver's designated start time and the start time of the scratch car.

=== Notes ===
- Race distance: 31 laps, 206 miles
- Race time limit: 3½ hours
- Winner's race time: 3 hours 10 minutes and 13 seconds (67.83 mph)
- Fastest time: 2 hours 33 minutes 28 seconds (80.53 mph) – Bill Thompson
- Fastest lap: 4 minutes 45 seconds (82.1 mph) – Bill Thompson

| Preceded by 1934 Australian Grand Prix | Australian Grand Prix; 1935 | Succeeded by 1937 Australian Grand Prix |
