= 1930 Australian Grand Prix =

The 1930 Australian Grand Prix was a motor race held at the Phillip Island circuit in Victoria, Australia on 24 March 1930. The race, which was organised by the Light Car Club of Victoria, was the third Australian Grand Prix and the third held at Phillip Island. It was staged as a scratch race with the Class A cars starting first, followed by the Class B entries three minutes later and the Class C cars a further three minutes after that. The Grand Prix title was awarded to the entry recording the fastest time for the race. Of the 22 cars which started the race, nine completed the race distance within the 4½ hour time limit.

The race was won by Bill Thompson driving a Bugatti Type 37A.

== Classes ==
Cars competed in classes according to cylinder capacity.

- Class A: Cars up to 850cc
- Class B: Cars over 850cc and up to 1100cc
- Class C: Cars over 1100cc and up to 1500cc
- Class D: Cars over 1500cc and up to 2000cc

Only one entry, the 1517cc Lea-Francis Hyper of Mick Carlton, was received for Class D. At the discretion of the organisers it was placed in Class C.

== Classification ==
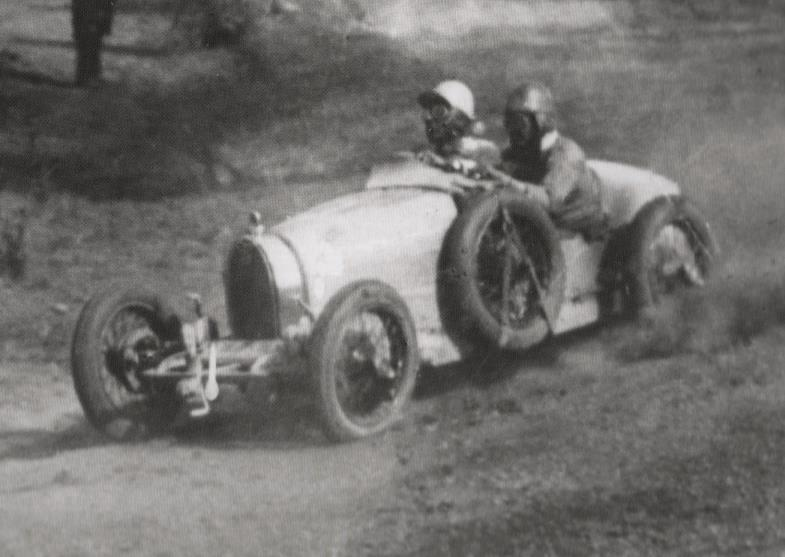
Bill Thompson won the race driving a Bugatti Type 37A

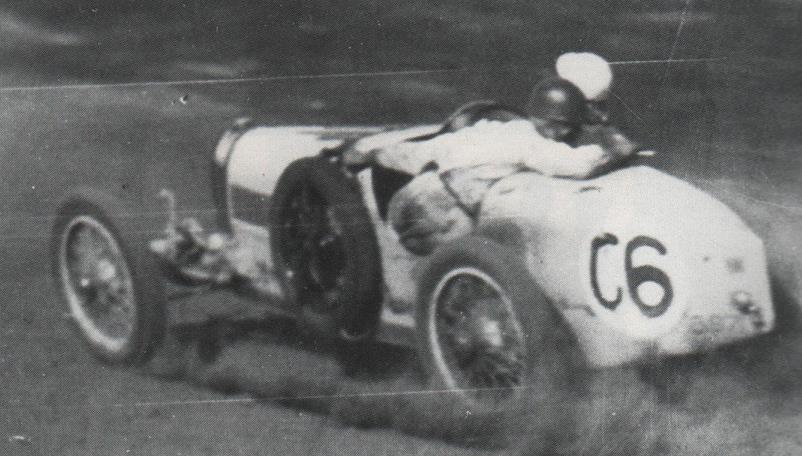
Harold Drake-Richmond placed second driving a Bugatti Type 37

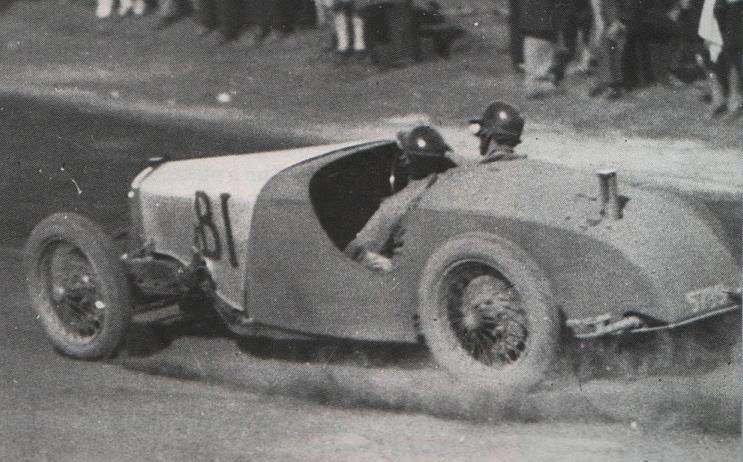
Barney Dentry placed seventh and won Class B driving a Riley Nine

Albert Edwards (Alvis) failed to finish the race

Pos	No.	Class	Driver	Car	Laps	Time / Remarks
1	C10	C	Bill Thompson	Bugatti Type 37A s/c	31	3h 06m 00s
2	C6	C	Harold Drake-Richmond	Bugatti Type 37	31	3h 25m 00s
3	A1	A	Cyril Dickason	Austin 7	31	3h 30m 30s
4	A3	A	Harry Burkill	Austin 7	31	3h 44m 30s
5	A10	A	Ken McKinney	Austin 7	31	3h 46m 00s
6	A1	C	John Goodall	Aston Martin-Anzani	31	3h 47m 30s
7	B1	B	Barney Dentry	Riley Nine Brooklands	31	3h 51m 30s
8	B7	B	Jack Edwards	Sénéchal	31	4h 06m 30s
9	A8	A	Wally Whelan	Morris Minor	31	4h 06m 30s
DNF	C3	C	Ron Gardner	Alvis 12/50	19	Magnetto
DNF	A2	A	Clarrie May	Austin 7	17	Rollover
DNF	C2	C	Albert Edwards	Alvis FWD s/c	16	Accident
DNF	C5	C	Arthur Terdich	Bugatti Type 37A s/c	10	Con rod
DNF	A5	A	Les Jennings	Morris Minor	7	Engine bearings
DNF	C4	C	Mick Carlton	Lea-Francis Hyper	?	Gearbox
DNF	A6	A	Jack McCutcheon	Morris Minor	?	Engine bearings
DNF	A7	A	Bernie Sutton	Morris Minor	?	Engine bearings
DNF	B4	B	Bill Johnson	Riley Nine Brooklands	?	Bearings
DNF	B5	B	Frank Matthews	Standard s/c	?	Ignition
DNF	C7	C	Reg Brearley	Bugatti Type 37	?	Engine
DNF	B6	B	Bill Lowe	Lombard AL3 s/c	0	Overheating
DNF	B8	B	Frank Corrigan	Amilcar	0	Accident

Note: DNF indicates that car did not finish.

== Notes ==
- Attendance: Over 7,000
- Race distance: 200 miles
- Entries: 28
- Starters: 22
- Classified finishers: 9
- Winner's average speed: 65.5 miles per hour (105.4 km/h)
- Sealed Handicap winner: Cyril Dickason (Austin 7)
- Fastest lap: Bill Thompson – approx. 75 mph (new lap record)
- Race time limit: 4½ hours

Preceded by 1929 Australian Grand Prix	Australian Grand Prix; 1930	Succeeded by 1931 Australian Grand Prix
