= 1933 Australian Grand Prix =

Race at Phillip Island circuit in Victoria

The 1933 Australian Grand Prix was a motor race held at the Phillip Island circuit in Victoria, Australia on 20 March 1933. Organised by the Light Car of Australia, it was the sixth Australian Grand Prix and the sixth to be held at Phillip Island. The race, which was the most important annual car competition in Australia, was open to cars of up to 2300cc engine capacity, the 2000cc limit of previous years having been increased for 1933.

The Grand Prix was won by Bill Thompson driving a Riley Brooklands. Thompson's win was his third Australian Grand Prix victory.

== Race format ==
The Grand Prix was staged as a handicap race with the first car, the Austin of Ken McKinney, scheduled to start 35 minutes before the last car, the Bugatti of Bill Williamson. McKinney was subsequently re-handicapped to 32 minutes. As Williamson's car was withdrawn prior to the race, the Bugatti of Arthur Terdich (off six minutes) was the last car to start.

== Race classification ==
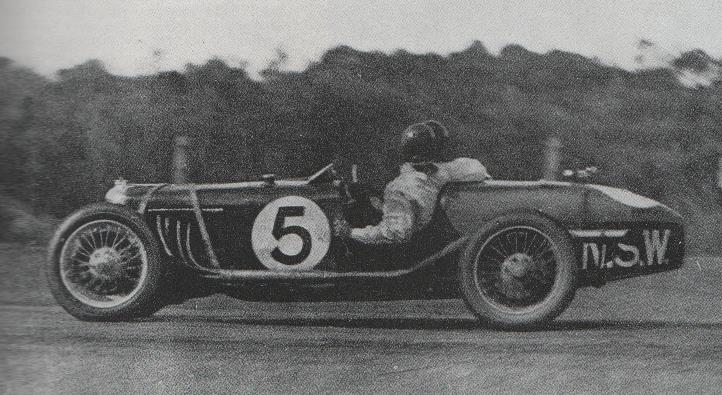
Race winner Bill Thompson (Riley Brooklands) contesting the 1933 Australian Grand Prix

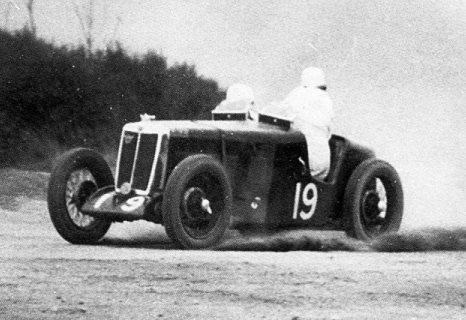
The third placed MG Magna of Les Jennings cornering during the race

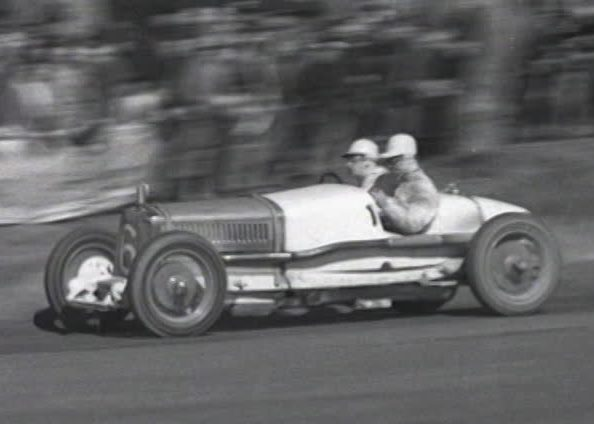
Neil Gullifer drove a Ballot but did not finish the race.

Position	Driver	No.	Car	Entrant	Handicap (minutes)	Laps
1	Bill Thompson	5	Riley Brooklands	W Thompson	8	31
2	Harold Drake-Richmond	12	Bugatti Type 37	H Drake-Richmond	16	31
3	Les Jennings	19	MG Magna	L Jennings	24	31
4	Clarrie May	16	Austin 7	Austin Distributors P/L	19	31
5	Ken McKinney	20	Austin 7	K McKinney	32	31
6	Bill Lowe	14	Lombard	WH Lowe	16	31
FO	Norman Putt & Jack Clements (relief driver)	10	Bugatti Type 37	Britannia Motors P/L	14	31
DNF	Neil Gullifer	6	Ballot	Britannia Motors P/L	10	24
DNF	Carl Junker	7	Bugatti Type 39	EG McKay	12	24
DNF	Merton Wreford	8	Bugatti Type 39	M Wreford	12	20
DNF	Geoff Disher	17	Salmson	G Disher	21	9
DNF	Jack McGrath	11	Bugatti Type 37	J McGrath	14	6
DNF	Cec Warren	9	Bugatti Type 37	Britannia Motors P/L	12	4
DNF	Arthur Terdich	2	Bugatti Type 37A	AJ Terdich	6	1
DNF	Wally Mullett	15	Lea-Francis	Britannia Motors P/L	16	1
DNS	Bill Williamson	1	Bugatti Type 43	LG Jackson	Scratch	-
DNS	Doug Shepherd	3	Frazer Nash	DF Shepherd	7	-
DNS	Jack Clements	4	Bugatti Type 38	J Clements	8	-
DNS	Alan Chamberlain	18	Chamberlain	A Chamberlain	23	-

=== Key ===
- FO: Flagged off. (completed the full race distance but not within the allocated time limit)
- DNF: Did not finish
- DNS: Did not start

=== Notes ===
- Race distance: 324.280 km (31 laps x 10.478 km)
- Winner's race time: 3h 9m 05s (102.90 km/h)
- Only six cars completed the course within the allotted time limit.
- Fastest Time: Bill Thompson, 2h 45m 51s
- Fastest lap: Merton Wreford

Preceded by 1932 Australian Grand Prix	Australian Grand Prix; 1933	Succeeded by 1934 Australian Grand Prix
