= Bill Thompson (racing driver) =

Australian racing driver (1906–1945)

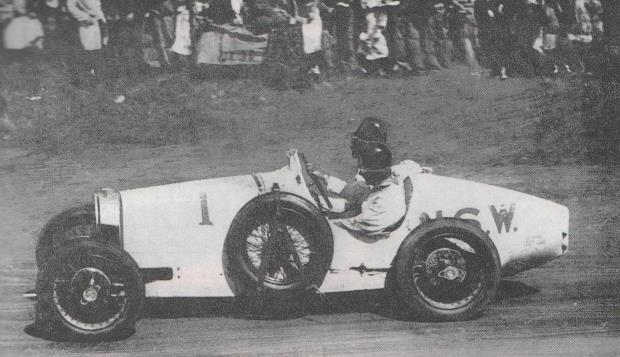
Bill Thompson (Bugatti Type 37A) contesting the 1932 Australian Grand Prix

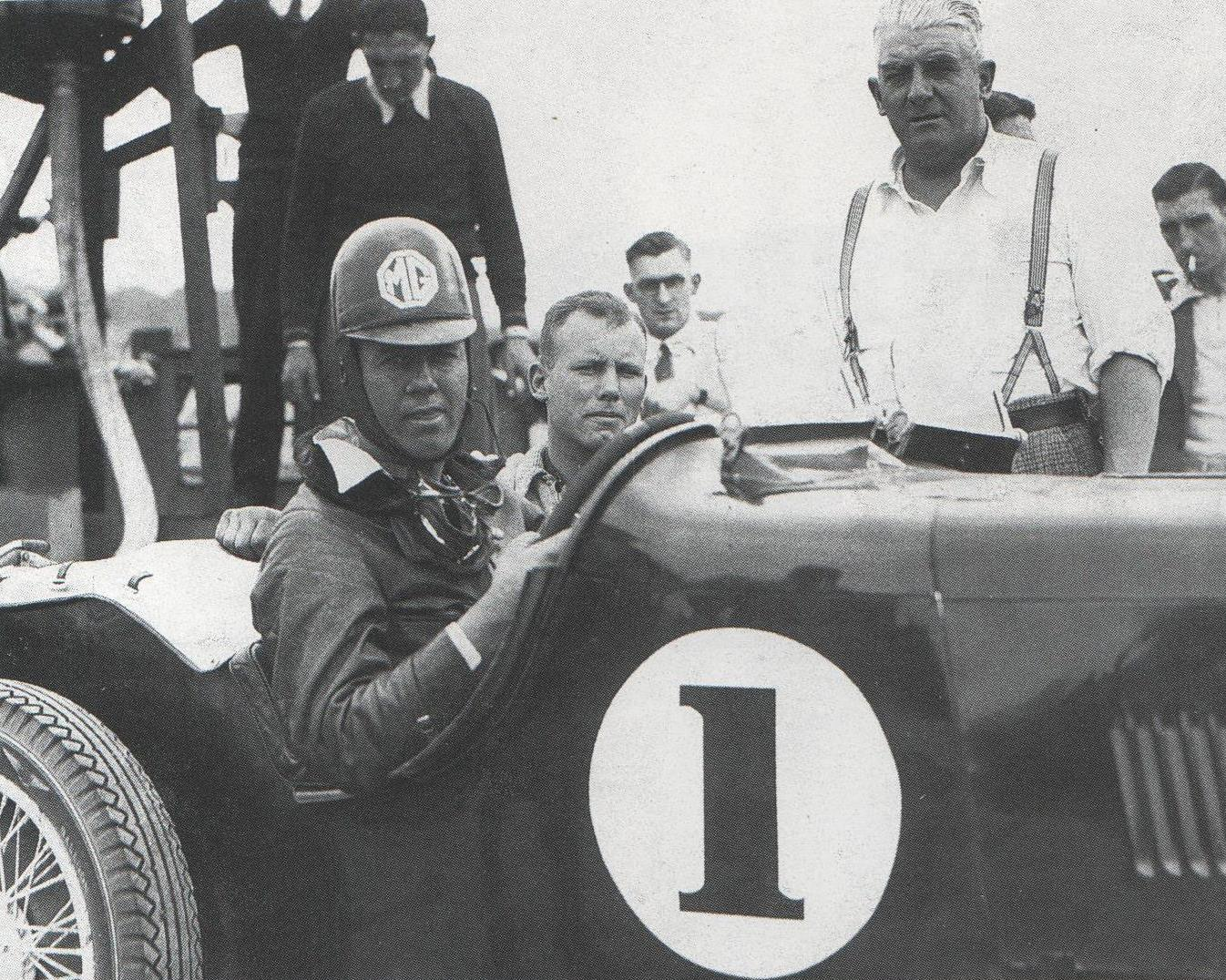
Thompson at the wheel of an MG K3 Magnette at the 1935 Australian Grand Prix

William Bethel Thompson (28 December 1906 – 12 February 1945) was an Australian racing driver. From Summer Hill, Sydney, he was active in motor sport from 1928 to 1936. His competition cars included various Bugattis, a Riley Brooklands and an MG K3. Although his career was not taken to the international level, he met with considerable successful in Australia, winning the Australian Grand Prix three times.

Thompson died as a result of an aircraft accident on 12 February 1945 in the Marshall Islands, Pacific Ocean. At the time of the accident, Thompson was serving in the Royal Australian Air Force and was travelling as an unauthorised passenger in a Consolidated PB2Y Coronado of the United States Navy.

== Career results ==
Year	Race	Position	Car
1930	Australian Grand Prix	1st	Bugatti Type 37A
1932	Australian Grand Prix	1st	Bugatti Type 37A
1933	Australian Grand Prix	1st	Riley Brooklands
1934	Australian Grand Prix	2nd	MG K3 Magnette
1935	Australian Grand Prix	2nd	MG K3 Magnette

Sporting positions
Preceded by Arthur Terdich	Winner of the Australian Grand Prix; 1930	Succeeded by Carl Junker
Preceded by Carl Junker	Winner of the Australian Grand Prix; 1932 & 1933	Succeeded by Bob Lea-Wright
