= 1932 Australian Grand Prix =

The 1932 Australian Grand Prix was a motor race held at the Phillip Island circuit in Victoria, Australia on 14 March 1932. It was the fifth Australian Grand Prix and the fifth to be held at Phillip Island.

The race was organized by the Light Car Club of Australia, formerly known as the Victorian Light Car Club, and was limited to cars having an engine with a piston displacement of 2000cc or less. It was the first Australian Grand Prix to be decided on a straight handicap basis, with the winner being the first car to complete the 31 laps. The two "scratch" competitors had to concede starts ranging up to 29 minutes, equating to an advantage of four laps. The previous practice of cars contesting four classes was discontinued. Weather conditions were reported to be "ideal".

The race, in which there were 18 starters, was won by Bill Thompson driving a Bugatti. Thompson was also awarded the Herald Trophy for recording the fastest time of the race.

== Classification ==
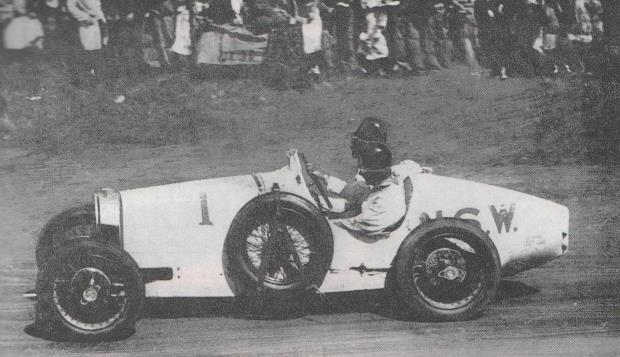
Race winner Bill Thompson (Bugatti Type 37A) contesting the 1932 Australian Grand Prix

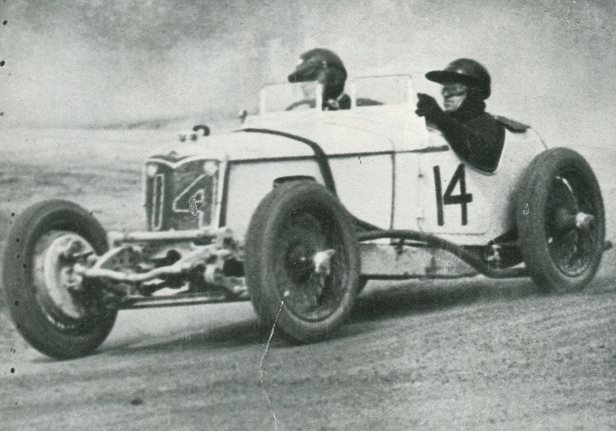
Bill Williamson placed ninth driving a Riley

Pos	No.	Driver	Entrant	Car	Handicap	Laps	Handicap time	Actual time
1	1	Bill Thompson	Woolworth Tyre Co	Bugatti Type 37A s/c	Scratch	31	3h 15m 11s	2h 40m 11s
2	12	Geoff Disher	G Disher	Salmson	16 min	31	3h 19m 11s	3h 00m 07s
3	5	Cyril Dickason	Austin Distributors P/L	Austin 7 Ulster	8 min	31	3h 24m 28s	2h 57m 28s
4	9	Mert Wreford	M Wreford	Bugatti Brescia	15 min	31	3h 28m 51s	3h 08m 51s
5	3	Carl Junker	C Junker	Bugatti Type 39	4 min	31	3h 34m 27s	3h 03m 27s
6	22	Bill Northam	J Wall	Austin 7 s/c	29 min	31	3h 36m 24s	3h 30m 24s
7	20	Les Jennings	L Jennings	Morris Cowley	26 min	31	3h 39m 31s	3h 30m 31s
8	18	Clarrie May	Austin Distributors P/L	Austin 7 s/c	26 min	31	3h 40m 36s	3h 31m 36s
9	14	Bill Williamson	W Johnson	Riley	18 min	31	3h 58m 07s	3h 41m 07s
10	4	Barney Dentry	G Dentry	Riley Brooklands	6 min	31	4h 11m 55s	3h 41m 55s
Ret	16	Graham Tucker	Rhodes Motor Co. P/L	Triumph s/c	20 min	16		
Ret	7	Harold Drake Richmond	H Drake Richmond	Bugatti Type 37	10 min	?		
Ret	2	Arthur Terdich	AJ Terdich	Bugatti Type 37A s/c	Scratch	8		
Ret	15	Alan Chamberlain	A Chamberlain	Chamberlain Special	19 min	4		
Ret	11	Ken Hopkins	K Hopkins	Bugatti Brescia	15 min	3+		
Ret	6	Bill Lowe	WH Lowe	Lombard AL3	10 min	3+		
Ret	19	Ken McKinney	K McKinney	Austin 7	26 min	2		
Ret	8	Albert Edwards	A Edwards	Alvis FWD s/c	10 min	1		
DNS (#)	21	Jack Sidebottom	J Sidebottom	Singer	28 min	–		
DNS (##)	17	Compton Jones	HC Jones	Austin 12	23 min	–		

(#) Sidebottom's Singer was excluded at scrutineering.

(##) The Austin 12 of Compton Jones was withdrawn after its engine suffered a piston failure during practice.

== Notes ==
- Race distance: 31 laps, 206 miles, 321.8 km
- Race time limit: Four and a quarter hours
- Fastest time: Bill Thompson – 2h 40m 11s (76.27 mph)
- Fastest lap: Bill Thompson – 4m 49.4s (82 mph)

Preceded by 1931 Australian Grand Prix	Australian Grand Prix; 1932	Succeeded by 1933 Australian Grand Prix
