= 1931 Australian Grand Prix =

The 1931 Australian Grand Prix was a motor race held at the Phillip Island Circuit in Victoria, Australia on 23 March 1931. The race, which was the fourth Australian Grand Prix and the fourth to be held at Phillip Island, had 19 entries and 14 starters. It was organised by the Victorian Light Car Club.

The race was staged using a handicap format with the first car starting 35 minutes before the two "Scratch" cars. Prize money was paid for both handicap and overall results with the principle prize of £100 awarded to the fastest car to complete the distance.

Carl Junker was awarded the Grand Prix win, having set the fastest time driving a Bugatti Type 39. The Handicap Section was won by Cyril Dickason, driving an Austin 7.

== Classes ==
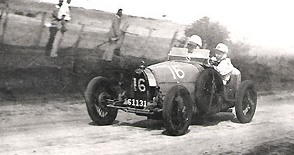
Carl Junker set fastest time and was awarded the Grand Prix win, driving a Bugatti Type 39

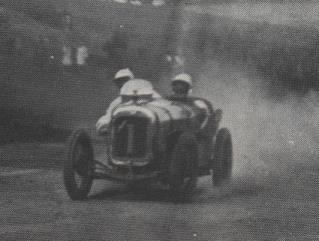
Cyril Dickason (Austin 7) recorded second fastest time and won the Handicap award

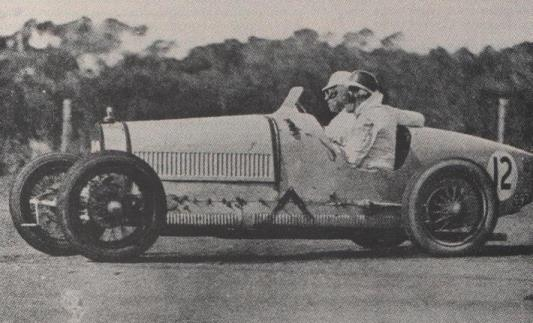
Harold Drake-Richmond (Bugatti Type 37) set the third fastest race time

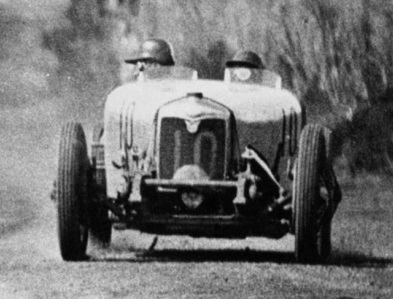
Barney Dentry (Riley Brooklands) set the fourth fastest race time

Car competed in four classes:

- A – 850cc
- B – 1100cc
- C – 1500cc
- D – 2000cc

== Classification ==
Pos	No.	Class	Driver	Car	Laps	Time / Reason for ret.	Handicap (mins)	Handicap Pos.
1	16	C	Carl Junker	Bugatti Type 39	31	2h 54m 50s	10	2
2	1	A	Cyril Dickason	Austin 7 Ulster s/c	31	3h 02m 24s	30	1
3	12	C	Harold Drake-Richmond	Bugatti Type 37	31	3h 03m 19s	10	3
4	10	B	Barney Dentry	Riley Brooklands	31	3h 09m 39s	11	4
5	13	B	Joan Richmond	Riley Nine	31	3h 34m 00s	22	6
6	3	A	Cec Warren	Austin 7 Ulster	31	3h 35m 21s	35	5
Ret	15	C	Hope Bartlett	Bugatti Type 37A s/c	29	Engine	Scratch	
Ret	19	D	Les Jennings	Morris Oxford	28	Connecting rod	22	
Ret	2	A	Clarrie May	Austin 7 s/c	18		30	
Ret	4	A	Ian Russell	Morris Minor	15	Engine	32	
Ret	20	D	Jack Clements	Bugatti Type 30	14	Crankshaft	9	
Ret	18	D	Jack Sidebottom	Singer	12		24	
Ret	14	C	Arthur Terdich	Bugatti Type 37A s/c	8	Connecting rod	Scratch	
Ret	9	B	Bill Lowe	Lombard AL.3 s/c	0	Gearbox	11	
DNS	5	A	Eric Armstrong	Triumph s/c	–		29	
DNS	6	B	Alan Chamberlain	Chamberlain	–		23	

== Notes ==
- Weather: Fine & mild
- Race time limit: 4¼ hours from the commencement of the race, i.e., from the first car to start
- Fastest lap: Hope Bartlett – 4'45.00 (79.90 mph)
- Average speed of winning car: 69.87 mph

Preceded by 1930 Australian Grand Prix	Australian Grand Prix; 1931	Succeeded by 1932 Australian Grand Prix
