= Bugatti Type 35 =

Bugatti racing car, 1924 to 1930

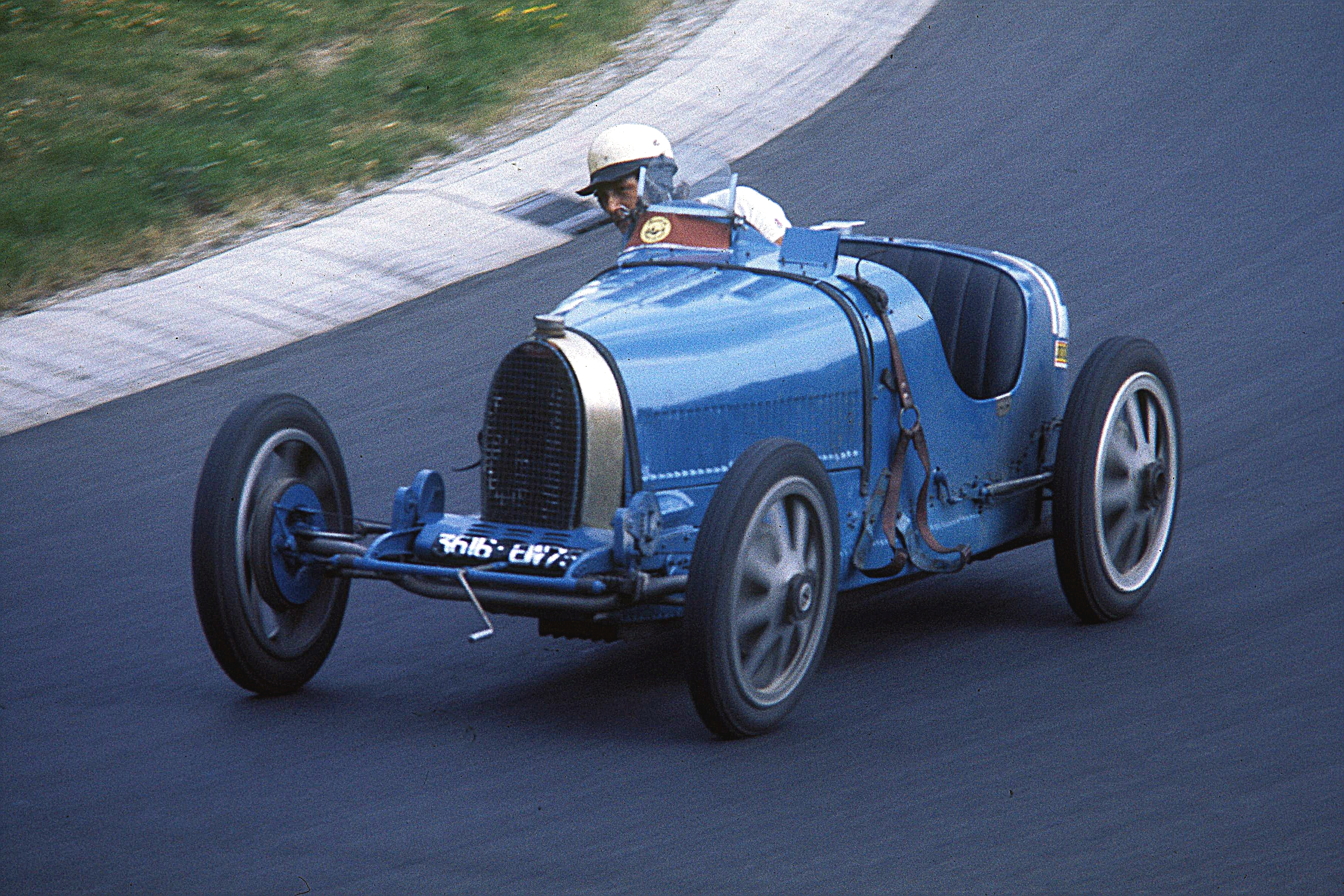

Overview
- Manufacturer: Automobiles Ettore Bugatti
- Production: 1924–1930
- Assembly: France: Molsheim-Dorlisheim, Alsace (Usine Bugatti de Molsheim)
- Designer: Ettore Bugatti

Body and chassis
- Class: Grand Prix, Formula Libre
- Body style: Underslung Type
- Layout: FR
- Chassis: Steel ladder frame, aluminum body

Powertrain
- Engine: 1,092–2,262 cc (67–138 cu in) 3-valve SOHC straight-8; 60–130 hp (45–95 kW)
- Transmission: 4-speed manual + reverse

Dimensions
- Wheelbase: 2,400 mm (94.5 in)
- Length: 3,680 mm (144.9 in)
- Width: 1,320 mm (52.0 in)
- Curb weight: 650–750 kg (1,435–1,655 lb)

Chronology
- Predecessor: Bugatti Type 30
- Successor: Bugatti Type 51

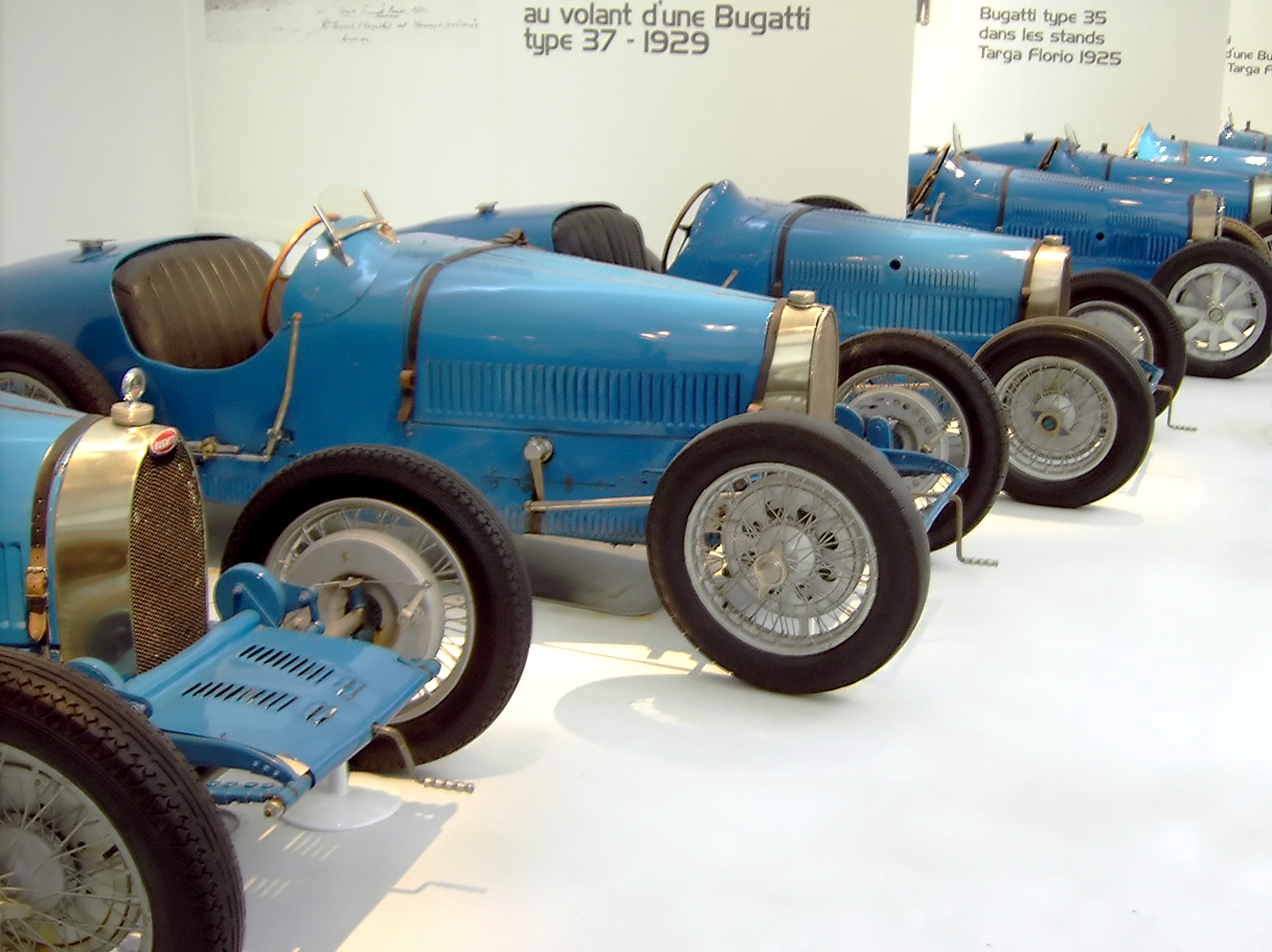
Bugatti Type 37 (left) and 35 (right) cars at the Cité de l'Automobile Museum, Mulhouse

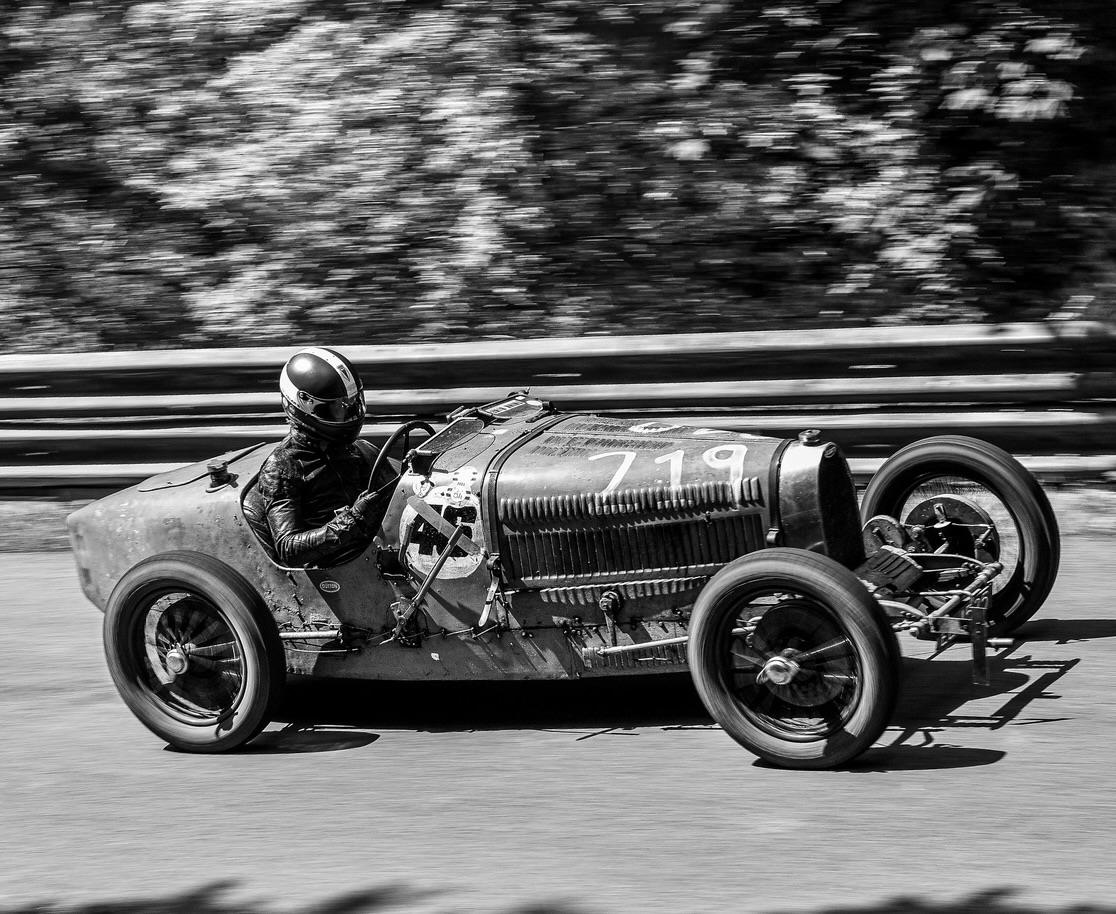
Ex Malcolm Campbell Bugatti Type 35 being campaigned in modern times

The Bugatti Type 35 is a race car design produced by Bugatti at their Molsheim premises between 1924 and 1930. It was successful when raced by the factory works team. It was also bought by a number of privateer clientele from around the world and pioneered the concept of a race-ready car available for purchase.

The arch/egg-shaped radiator is emblematic, as is the rear of the car. The tapered stern has been called a 'Bordino tail' and Ettore Bugatti may have been influenced by the shape of the earlier Fiat 804 driven and modified by Pietro Bordino. The car was the first to use cast alloy wheels.

The Type 35 was successful in its intended purpose, winning over 1,000 races. It took the Grand Prix World Championship in 1926 after winning 351 races and setting 47 records in the previous two years. At its height the Type 35 averaged 14 race wins per week. Bugatti won the Targa Florio for five consecutive years, from 1925 through 1929, with the Type 35.

== Type 35 (naturally aspirated) ==
The original model was introduced at the 1924 French Grand Prix, held at Lyon. The inaugural outing for the Type 35 was not a success due to fitment of badly-vulcanised Dunlop tyres. Despite this, the model showed promise and became increasingly competitive with refinements being made.

The car used an evolution of the three-valve 1,991 cc (121.5 cu in) overhead cam straight-eight engine first seen on the Type 29. Bore and stroke was of 60 mm × 88 mm (2.36 in × 3.46 in) as on many previous Bugatti models.

This new powerplant featured a roller bearing system, numbering five in total, which allowed the engine to rev to 6,000 rpm. Output was up to 90 hp (67 kW). Alloy wheels were a novelty, as was the hollow front axle for reduced unsprung weight. Another feature of the Type 35, that was to become a Bugatti trademark, was passing the springs through the front axle rather than simply U-bolting them together as was done on their earlier cars. The Type 35 also featured an 8-day dashboard clock made by Doxa.

96 of these un-supercharged T35 examples were produced.

== Type 35A ==
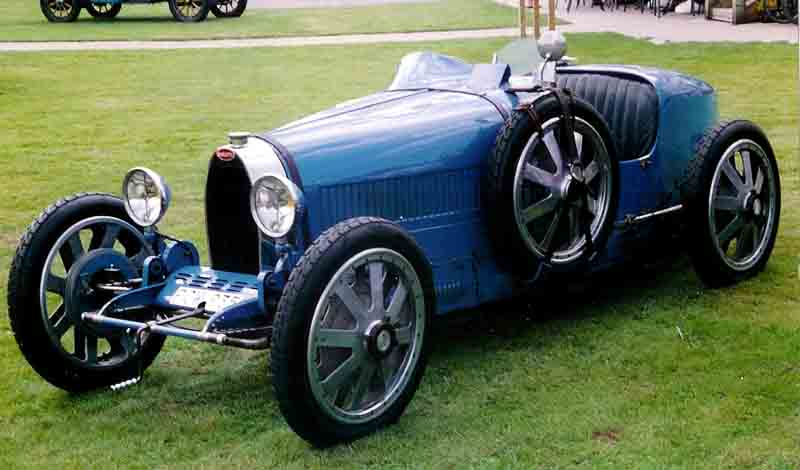
1925 Bugatti Type 35A "Tecla"

A mechanically simpler version of the Type 35 appeared in May 1925. Intended for road use while retaining the 'racing look', several were raced anyway and with some success. The public nicknamed the model "Tecla" after a famous maker of imitation jewellery. The Tecla's engine used plain bearings on the crankshaft (for ease of maintenance), smaller valves, and coil ignition like the Type 30, it was normally delivered on regular wire-spoked wheels.

139 examples of the Type 35A were produced.

== Type 35T ==
Bugatti introduced a special model for the 1926 Targa Florio race with an engine displacement increased to 2,262 cc (138.0 cu in) with a longer 100 mm (3.9 in) stroke; the car could not be used for Grands Prix due to rules limiting capacity to 2.0 litres.

13 T35Ts were produced.

== Type 35C ==
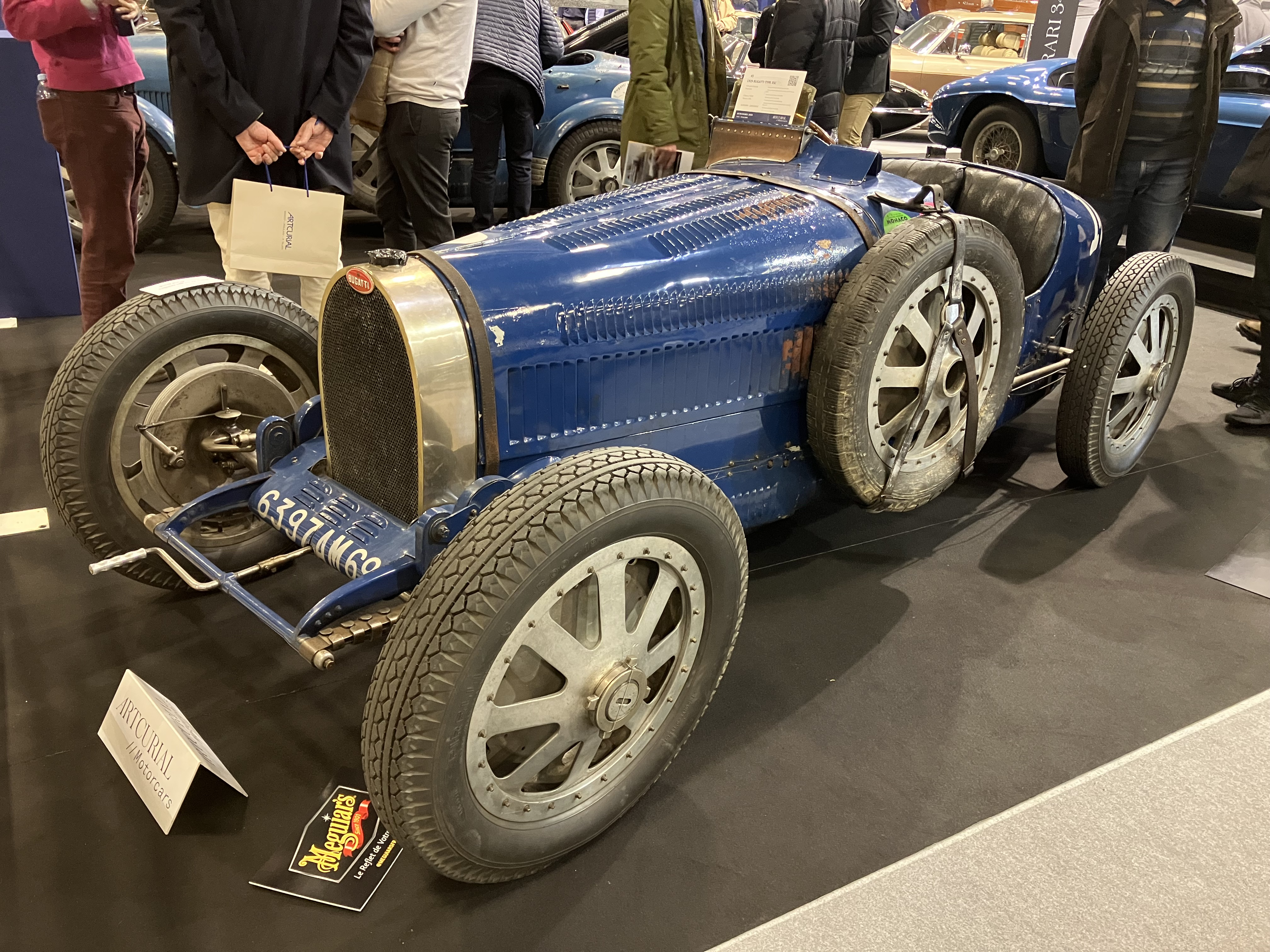
1929 Bugatti Type 35C

The Type 35C was introduced in 1926 and featured a Roots supercharger, despite Ettore Bugatti's disdain for forced induction. Output was nearly 128 bhp (95 kW) with a single Zenith carburettor. The Type 35C came first and second during its first race outing at the 1926 Milan Grand Prix held at Monza. This 2.0-litre supercharged configuration continued to be very dependable.

In 1929, Bugatti was charging 91,500 French francs for the Type 35C. French pilot Guy Bouriat bought two in March 1929.

Approximately 45 examples left the factory.

== Type 35B ==
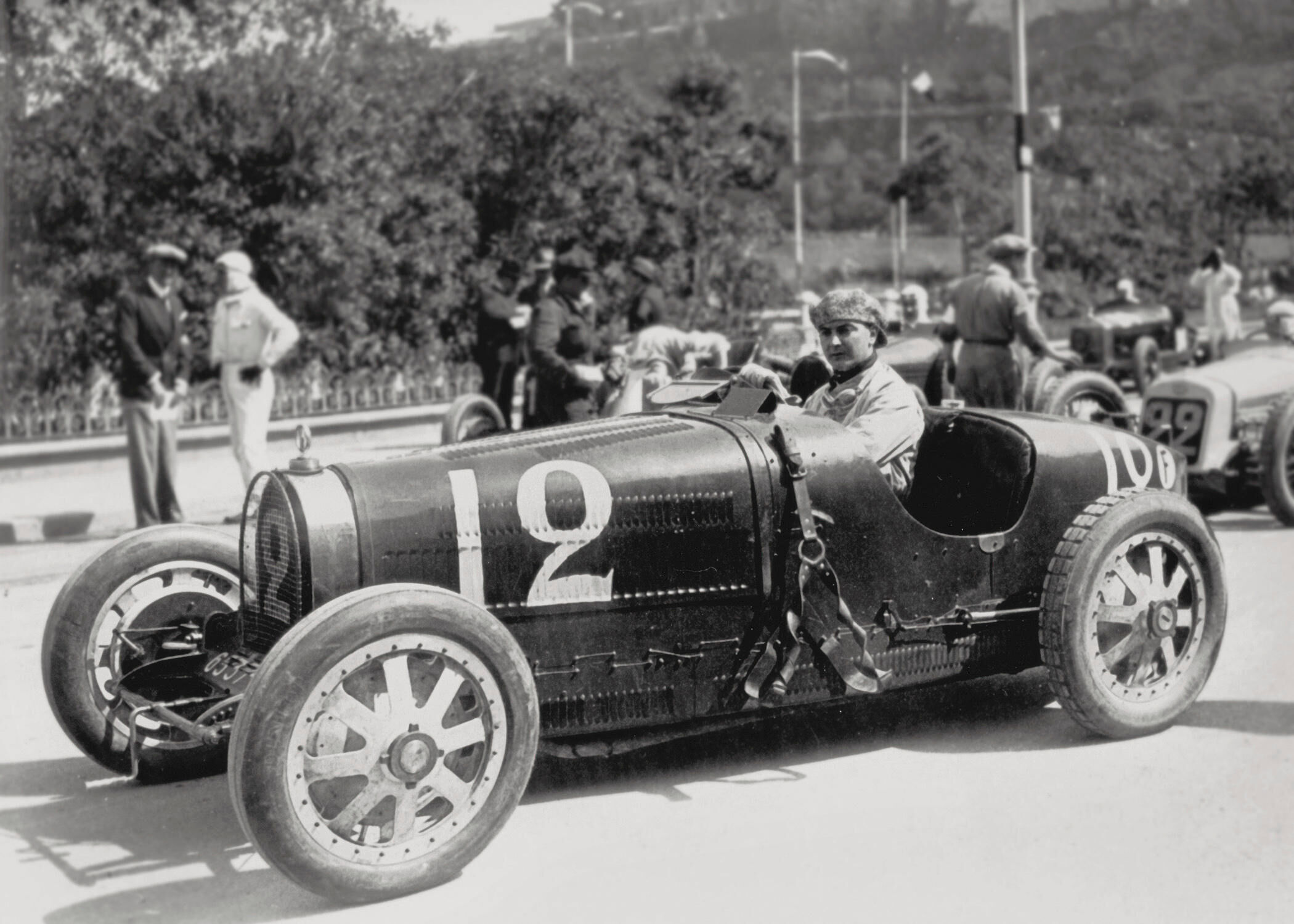
Inaugural Monaco Grand Prix winning Bugatti Type 35B. cn 4914

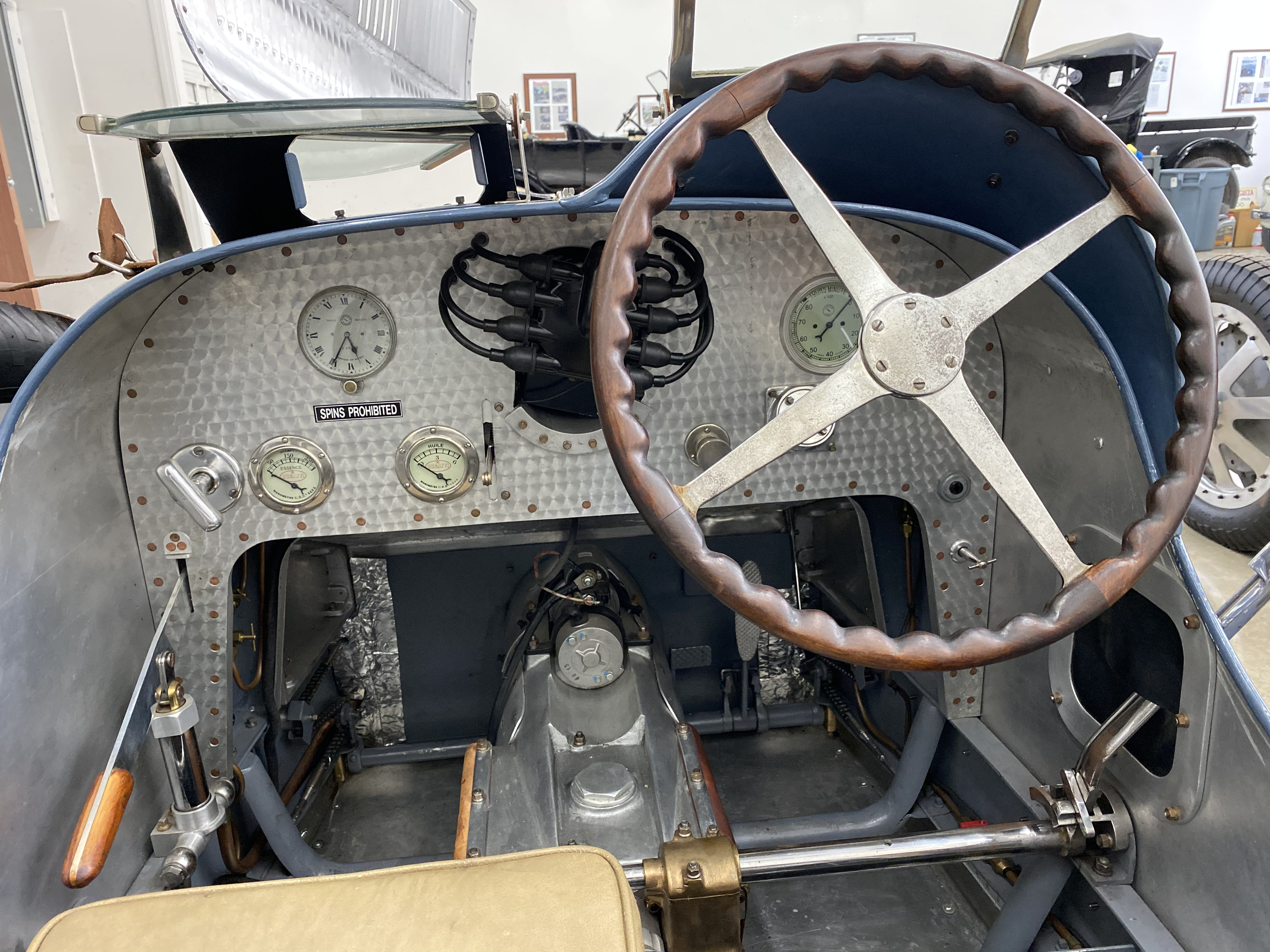
Bugatti Type 35B replica Dashboard

Named by the factory "Type 35TC" (Targa Compressor), this most powerful version became known colloquially as the "T35B". It shared the 2.3 litre engine of the Type 35T this time with a large supercharger added. Output was 138 bhp (103 kW). A British Racing Green Type 35B driven by William Grover-Williams won the inaugural 1929 Monaco Grand Prix. While having more torque, the Type 35B did not rev as high and engine fuel consumption levels were such that the factory reverted to producing the T35C.

Around 37 Type 35B were produced.

== Type 37 ==
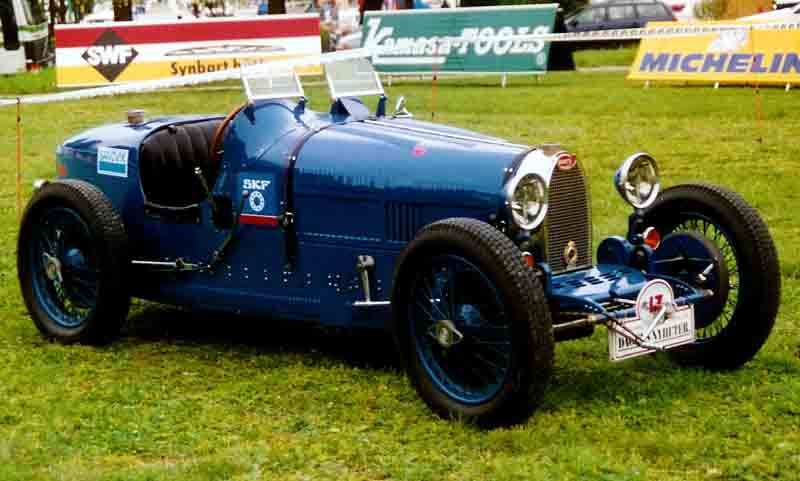
1928 Bugatti Type 37

The Type 37 sports car used the same chassis and bodywork as the full-power Type 35, but were mostly delivered with wire wheels. Fitted with a new 1.5 litre (1,496 cc, 91 cu in) straight-4 engine (69 mm x 100 mm), it was easier to maintain for many privateer drivers. This engine was a SOHC three-valve design and produced 60 bhp (45 kW). The same engine went on to be used in the Type 40.

Around 223 Type 37s were built.

== Type 37A ==
1928 Bugatti Type 37A Supercharged

The supercharged Type 37A enabled engine output to reach 60–67 kW (80–90 bhp). It also had larger shrouded brake drums.

Around 67 Type 37As were produced.

== Type 39 ==
The Type 39 was similar to the Type 35 except for the engine crankshaft, modified to produce a smaller 1.5 litre (1,493 cc, 91 cu in). Stroke was down from 88 mm to 66 mm, and a mix of plain and roller bearings were used in the crank.

10 examples were produced (some being supercharged (Type 39A)).

A single 1.1 litre (1,092 cc, 67 cu in) version was also created by reducing the bore of the engine to 51.3 mm.

== Technical data ==
	Type 35A	Type 35	Type 35C	Type 35B	Type 39B	Type 39C	Type 39D	Type 39A	Type 39	Type 37	Type 37A
Engine:	Front mounted 8-cylinder in-line engine									4-cylinder
Displacement:	1991 cc			2262 cc	1091 cc	1484 cc	1493 cc	1495 cc		1496 cc
Bore × stroke:	60 x 88 mm			60 x 100 mm	51.3 x 66 mm	54 x 81 mm	60 x 66 mm	52 x 88 mm		69 x 100 mm
Max power at rpm:	70 hp at 4000 rpm	100 hp at 5000 rpm	135 hp at 5500 rpm		80 hp at 5000 rpm	120 hp at 6000 rpm			85 hp at 6000 rpm	65 hp at 4500 rpm	75 hp at 5000 rpm
Valve control:	3 valves per cylinder, SOHC
Compression:	Naturally aspirated		Roots compressor						Naturally aspirated		Roots
Carburetor:	2 Solex 35 or 2 Zenith 36		Zenith 48K		Zenith 36	2 Solex 35 or 2 Zenith 36				Zenith 36 UH or Solex
Upload:
Gearbox:	4-speed manual
Suspension front:	Rigid hollow shaft with semi-elliptical leaf springs running through the shaft				Rigid hollow axle with sail for pointing quail elliptical leaf feathers					Rigid solid axle
Suspension rear:	Rigid axle with inverted quarter-elliptical leaf springs
Brakes:	Drums, all-round
Chassis & body:	Aluminium body on steel ladder frame
Wheelbase:	240 cm
Dry weight:	750 kg									700 kg	720 kg
Top speed:	145 km/h	177 km/h	190 km/h		150 km/h	185 km/h			150 km/h

== Notable race victories ==
Year	Race	Driver	Car
1925	Rome Grand Prix	Carlo Massetti	Type 35
	Targa Florio	Bartolomeo Costantini	Type 35
	Circuito del Garda	Aymo Maggi	Type 35
1926	Coppa Acerbo	Luigi Spinozzi	Type 35
	Coppa Etna	Aymo Maggi	Type 35 A
	French Grand Prix	Jules Goux	Type 39 A
	Gran Premio de San Sebastián	Jules Goux	Type 39 A
	Italian Grand Prix	Louis Charavel	Type 39 A
	Rome Grand Prix	Aymo Maggi	Type 35
	Spanish Grand Prix	Bartolomeo Costantini	Type 35
	Targa Florio	Bartolomeo Costantini	Type 35 T
	Tripoli Grand Prix	François Eysermann	Type 35
1927	Targa Florio	Emilio Materassi	Type 35 C
	Tripoli Grand Prix	Emilio Materassi	Type 35 C
	Rome Grand Prix	Tazio Nuvolari	Type 35
	Solituderennen	August Momberger	Type 35 B
	Grand Prix de la Marne	Philippe Étancelin	Type 35 B
1928	French Grand Prix	William Grover-Williams	Type 35 C
	Italian Grand Prix	Louis Chiron	Type 37 A
	San Sebastián Grand Prix	Louis Chiron	Type 35 C
	Spanish Grand Prix	Louis Chiron	
	Targa Florio	Albert Divo	Type 35 B
	Tripoli Grand Prix	Tazio Nuvolari	Type 35 C
	Moroccan Grand Prix	Edward Meyer	Type 35 C
1929	French Grand Prix	William Grover-Williams	Type 35 B
	German Grand Prix	Louis Chiron	Type 35 C
	Spanish Grand Prix	Louis Chiron	
	Monaco Grand Prix	William Grover-Williams	Type 35 B
	Targa Florio	Albert Divo	Type 35 C
	Australian Grand Prix	Arthur Terdich	Type 37 A
	Algerian Grand Prix	Marcel Lehoux	Type 35 C
1930	Belgian Grand Prix	Louis Chiron	Type 35 C
	Czechoslovakian Grand Prix	Heinrich-Joachim von Morgen and Hermann zu Leiningen	Type 35 B
	Eifelrennen	Heinrich-Joachim von Morgen	Type 35 B
	French Grand Prix	Philippe Étancelin	Type 35 C
	Monaco Grand Prix	René Dreyfus	Type 35 B
	Australian Grand Prix	Bill Thompson	Type 37 A
1931	Australian Grand Prix	Carl Junker	Type 39
	Grand Prix des Frontières	Arthur Legat	Type 37 A
1932	Australian Grand Prix	Bill Thompson	Type 37 A
1933	Grand Prix des Frontières	Willy Longueville	Type 35 B
