= Riley Nine =

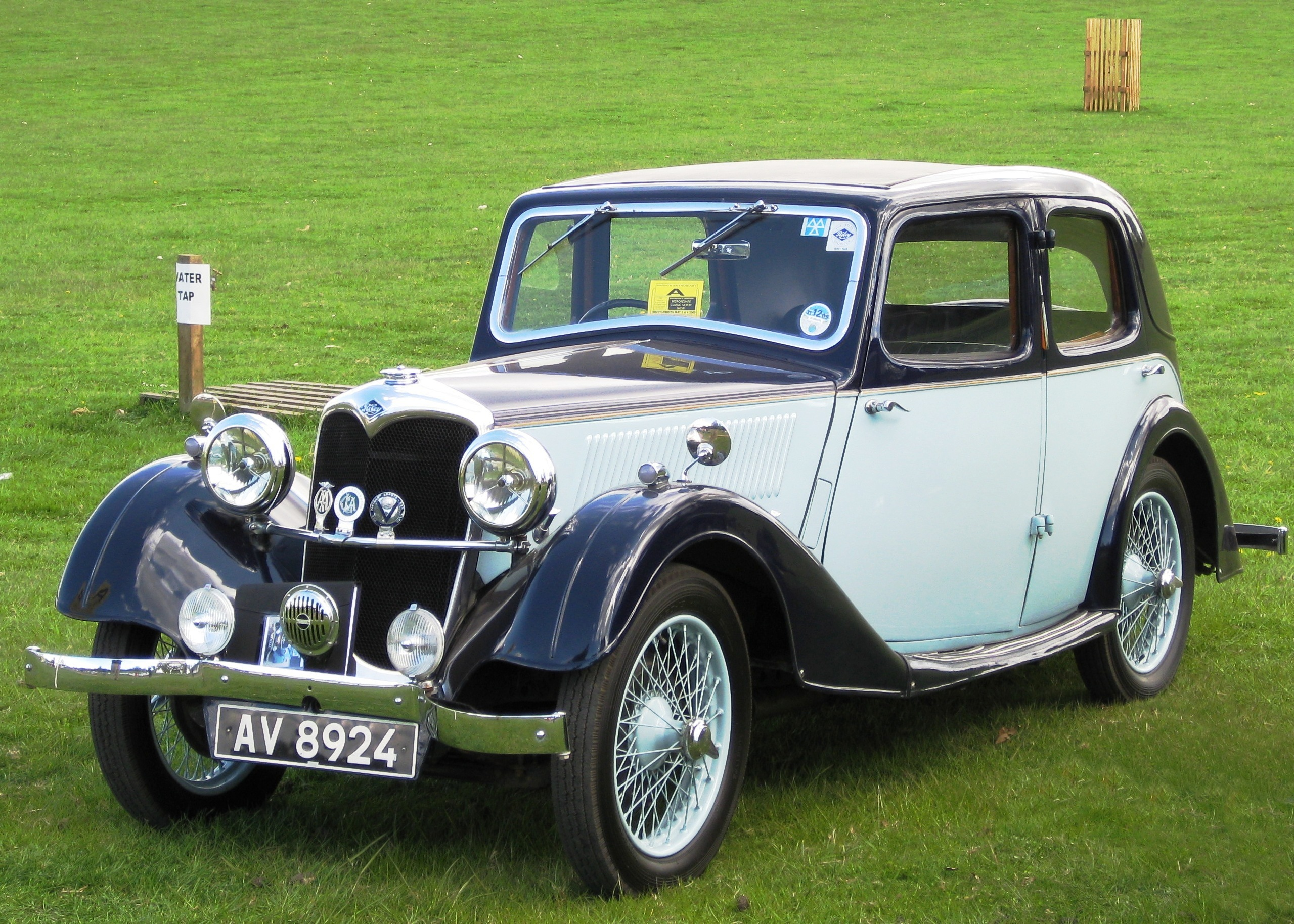
- 1937 Riley Nine with steel Merlin body by Briggs

Overview
- Manufacturer: Riley (Coventry) Limited
- Production: 1926–1938
- Assembly: United Kingdom: Coventry, England
- Designer: Percy and Stanley Riley

Body and chassis
- Body style: open 2-seater; through to; 4-door saloon; in many variations
- Related: Riley 12/6

Powertrain
- Engine: 1.1 L I4

Dimensions
- Wheelbase: 106 in (2,692 mm)
- Width: 57 in (1,448 mm)

The Riley Nine was one of the most successful light sporting cars produced by the British motor industry in the inter war period. It was made by the Riley company of Coventry, England with a wide range of body styles between 1926 and 1938.

Riley Nine engine

Layout
- Configuration: I4
- Displacement: 1.1 L (1,087 cc)
- Cylinder bore: 60.3 mm
- Piston stroke: 95.2 mm
- Cylinder block material: cast iron block inc. top half crankcase mounted on rubber bushings; two bearing crankshaft
- Cylinder head material: cast iron with hemispherical combustion chambers.; aluminium alloy pistons with 2 rings and oil scraper
- Valvetrain: OHV inclined at 45 degrees; operated by pushrods from; twin camshafts mounted high in the block

Combustion
- Fuel system: carburettor with hot spot piped from exhaust
- Management: timing by gear with hand control
- Fuel type: petrol
- Oil system: forced lubrication
- Cooling system: V-shaped film radiator mounted on rubber; water circulates naturally; fan fitted for overseas use

Output
- Power output: not published

Emissions
- Emissions control systems: none

== Design ==
The car was largely designed by two of the Riley brothers, Percy and Stanley. Stanley was responsible for the chassis, suspension and body and the older Percy designed the engine.

=== Engine ===
The 1,087 cc four-cylinder engine had hemispherical combustion chambers with the valves inclined at 45 degrees in a crossflow head. To save the expense and complication of overhead camshafts, the valves were operated by two camshafts mounted high in the crankcase through short pushrods and rockers. The engine was mounted in the chassis by a rubber bushed bar that ran through the block with a further mount at the rear of the gearbox. Drive was to the rear wheels through a torque tube and spiral bevel live rear axle mounted on semi elliptic springs.

Initially produced with a cone clutch drive train it quickly evolved to have a plate clutch driving through a Silent Third gearbox, then all helical dog change box to an ENV pre-selecta epicyclic gearbox. The engine gradually became stronger, gaining extra webs and internal oil feed to the rockers. The final iteration in the Merlin series gained a single plunger oil pump, replacing the double plunger, and an oil filter amongst many other updates.

=== Bodies ===
At launch in July 1926 two body styles were available, a fabric bodied saloon called the Monaco at £285 and a fabric four-seat tourer for £235. The saloon could reach 60 mph (97 km/h) and give 40 mpg_{‑imp} (7.1 L/100 km; 33 mpg_{‑US}). Very quickly a further two bodies were offered, the San Remo, an artillery wheeled basic saloon and a two-seater plus dickie open tourer and there was also the option of steel panelling rather than fabric for the four-seater tourer.

The thirties saw further models introduced, 1933 being particularly busy, with the 2 door Lynx, Kestrel, and Falcon all appearing. With each year customers demands for more refinement saw the cars get heavier and heavier so that by 1934 the Monaco and Kestrel were of all Aluminium coachbuilt construction. The Lynx gained 4 doors and lost the disappearing hood.

The Riley Imp, a sports version, was produced in the years 1934-1935, with a prototype version being displayed at the 1933 Motor Show at Olympia, London. The Imp gained quite a reputation for its good looks with swept back wings. Light bodied competition versions gained success in the 1934 Ulster Tourist Trophy, thereafter being known as the Riley Ulster Imp. Kay Petre and Dorothy Champney took 13th place in the 1934 Le Mans race in a standard bodied Riley Imp with competition chassis and drivetrain.

=== Revisions ===
After the car's 1926 launch, Mark 1 production actually started in 1927 at Percy's engine factory, due to some resistance in the main works to the new design. It was such a critically acclaimed success that after fewer than a thousand cars had been produced the works quickly shut down side-valve production and tooled up for the new Nine in early 1928. This switch to the main factory coincided with several modernisations of the Mark 1 - the cone clutch was dropped, the gear lever and handbrake were moved from the right to the centre of the car and a Riley steering box was adopted, thus making the car the Mark II. The Mark III was a gentle update of the II at the end of 1928, evolving stronger wheels and a different arrangement of rods to the rear brakes.

The Mark IV was a thorough re working of the Nine. Heavier Riley-made 6-stud hubs and axles replaced the bought-in five-stud items. A new cable braking system was introduced with larger drums. The range of bodies was further extended in 1929 with the Biarritz saloon which was a de-luxe version of the Monaco. The improved brakes were fitted using the Riley continuous cable system and if the cable stretched it could be adjusted from the driver's seat.

The Plus series saw the fuel tank moved to the rear of the chassis and an Autovac adopted, whilst the Plus Ultra adopted a new chassis that dropped between the axles, lowering the car.

More body variants were added over the next few years and in 1934 a Preselector gearbox was offered for £27 extra. The range was slimmed down in 1935 to the Monaco saloon, Kestrel streamlined saloon and Lynx four-seat tourer as the works started gearing up for production of the new 12 hp model.

=== Steel bodies ===
In an attempt to keep costs down Riley entered into an agreement with Briggs Manufacturing to produce a steel (non coach-built) body for a newly designed chassis. This new chassis was introduced in 1936 and incorporated such features as Girling rod operated brakes and a prop shaft final drive for the Nine (though the 12 hp variant retained the torque tube). The Briggs body was named the Merlin and was available alongside the last nine Kestrel variant, also built on the "Merlin" chassis. (This body was also used on the narrow track 12/4 chassis as a Falcon, replacing its coachbuilt body.) The Kestrel 9 was also adapted to suit the new Merlin chassis, unfortunately perhaps, also adopting the heavier looking Merlin wings.

The Briggs body evolved through 1937 with a large boot extension to be called the Touring Saloon and an additional body style was added on the same chassis - the higher specified special series Monaco (a completely new design from the previous car). The final version (and last nine model) was the 1938 Victor also available with 1496 cc engine. The Victor had the engine further forward to increase interior room, with the battery moved to the engine bay and smaller diameter wheels were fitted.

The Riley company was bought by Lord Nuffield in 1938 and Nine production ceased as the company pursued a strict two-engine line up, continued after the war with the RM series.

== Some catalogued bodies ==
| Type | Year | Notes |
|---|---|---|
| Monaco | 1926-1932 | Fabric bodied Saloon |
| Four-seat tourer | 1926-1931 | Fabric or steel bodied |
| Speed Model (Brooklands) | 1927-1931 | Low chassis, cycle wings and pointed tail. Tuned 50 bhp (37 kW) engine. |
| San Remo | 1928-1929 | Fabric saloon |
| 2 Seater Tourer | 1928-1930 | Steel bodied |
| Biarritz | 1929-1932 | De Luxe saloon |
| Plus Series | 1931-1932 | Rear fuel tank |
| Plus Ultra | 1932-1933 | Chassis dropped between axles |
| Gamecock | 1931-1932 | Open two-seater |
| Kestrel | 1933-1936 | 4 light Streamlined saloon |
| Monaco | 1933-1935 | All alloy bodied version |
| Falcon | 1933-1935 | Saloon with twin rear windows |
| Lincock | 1933-1935 | Fixed head coupé |
| Ascot | 1933-1935 | Drop head coupé |
| Lynx | 1933-1936 | Four-seat tourer |
| March Special | 1933-1935 | two/four-seat sports tourer built by John Charles of Kew to the design of driver Freddie March |
| Imp | 1934-1935 | 75 mph (121 km/h) sports version |
| Merlin | 1936-1937 | 4 light all steel streamlined saloon |
| Victor | 1938 | Re-worked Merlin saloon |

Some saloons

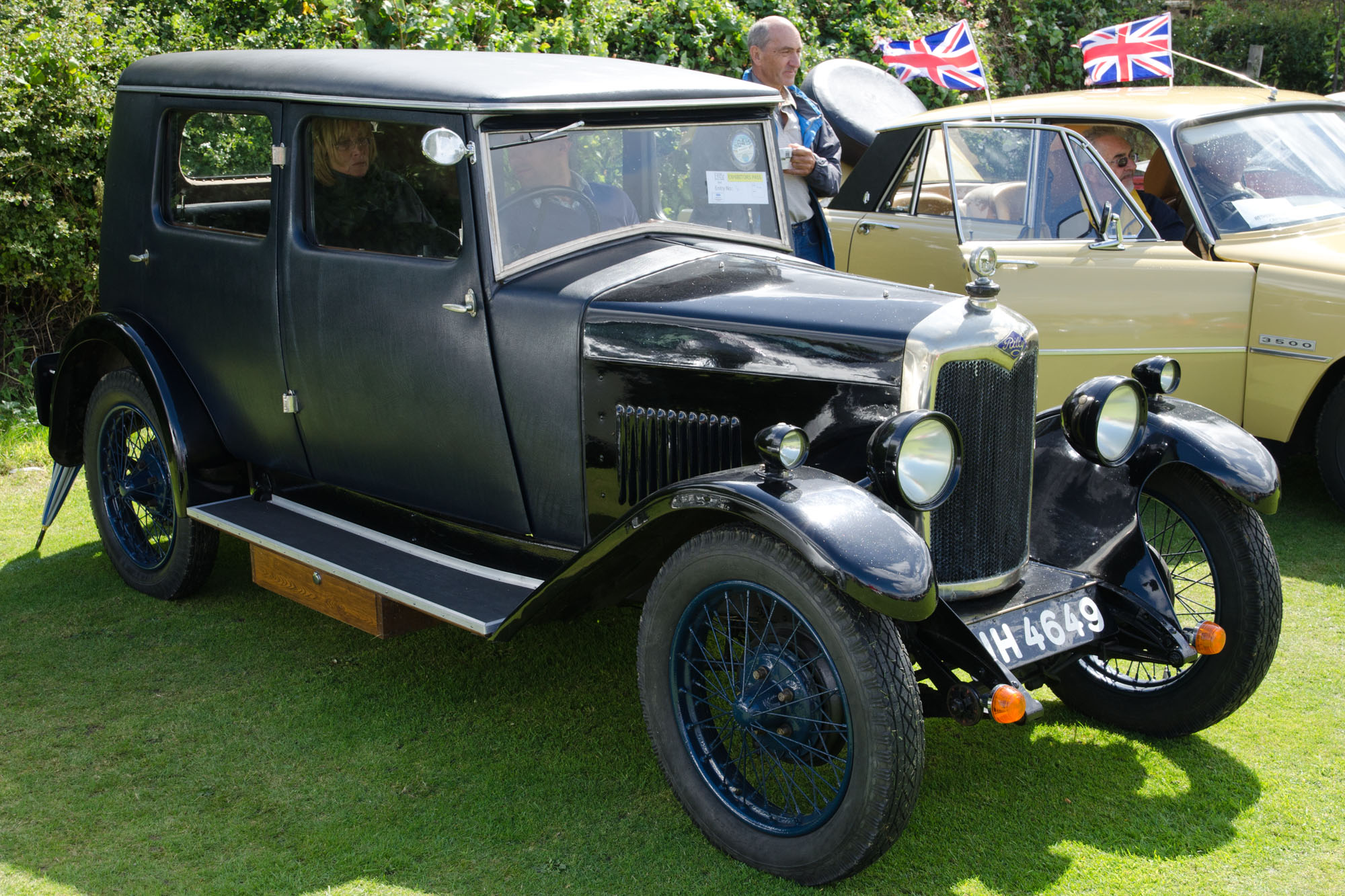
1928 Monaco (fabric)

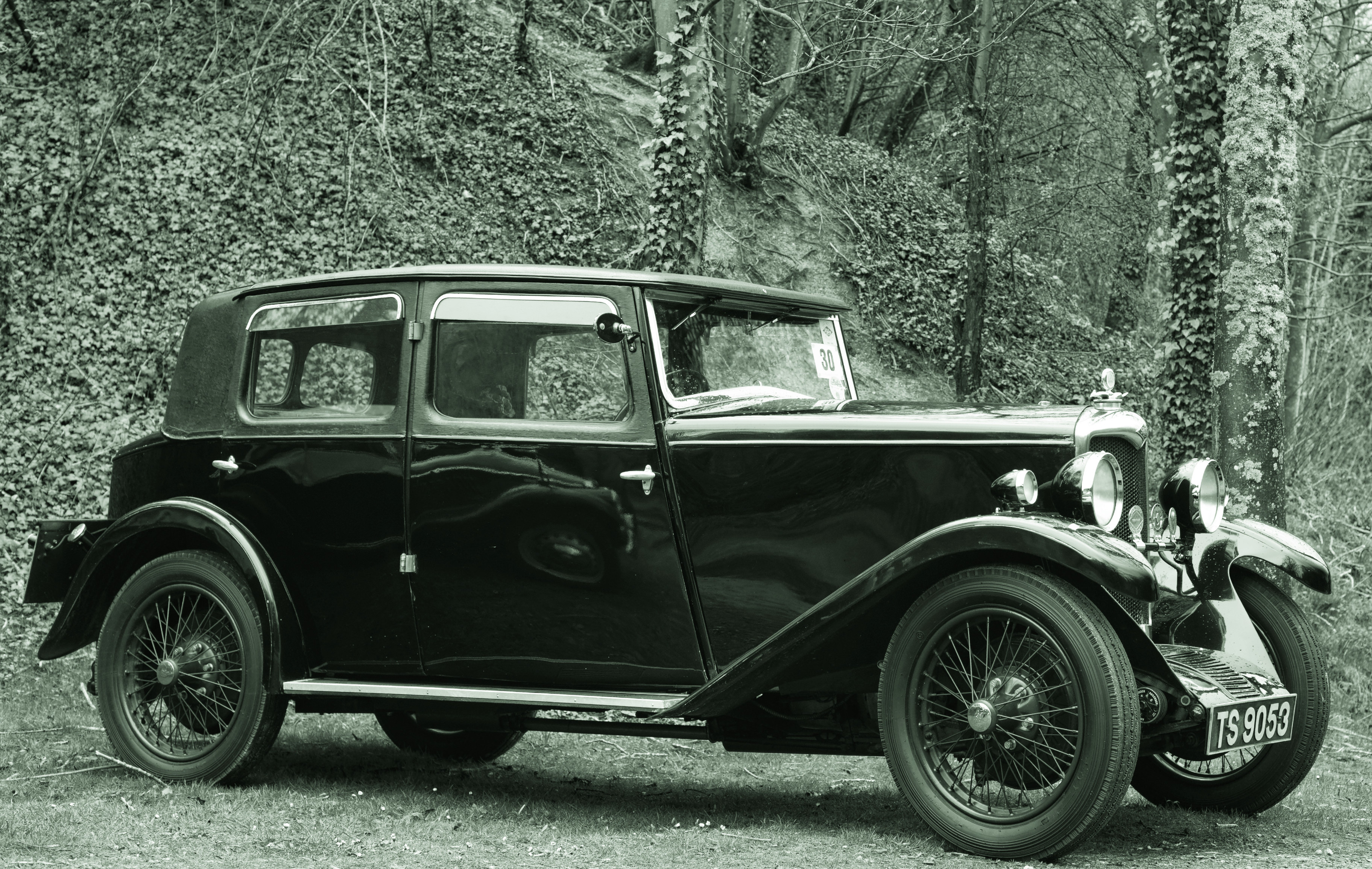
1930 Biarritz

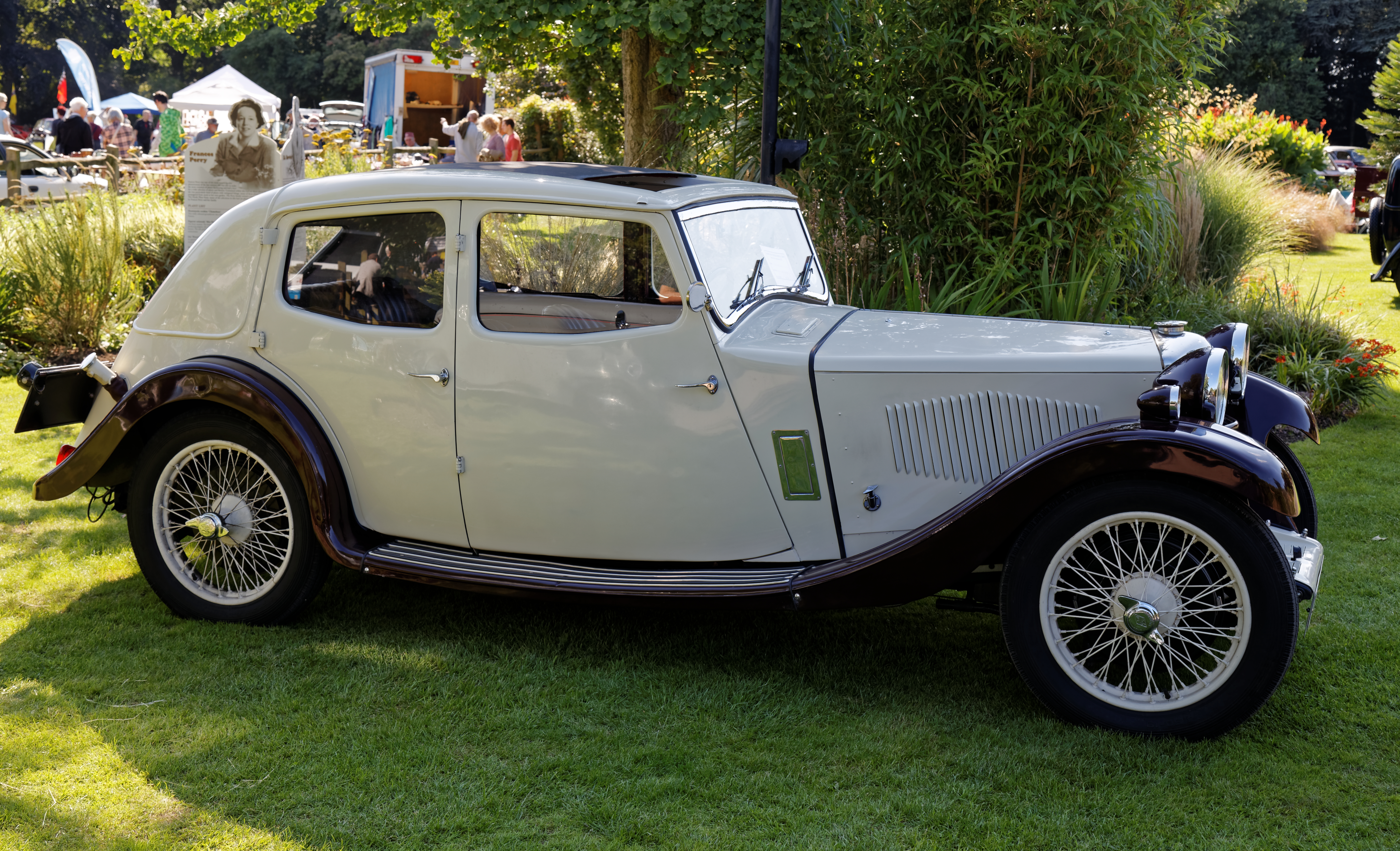
1934 Kestrel

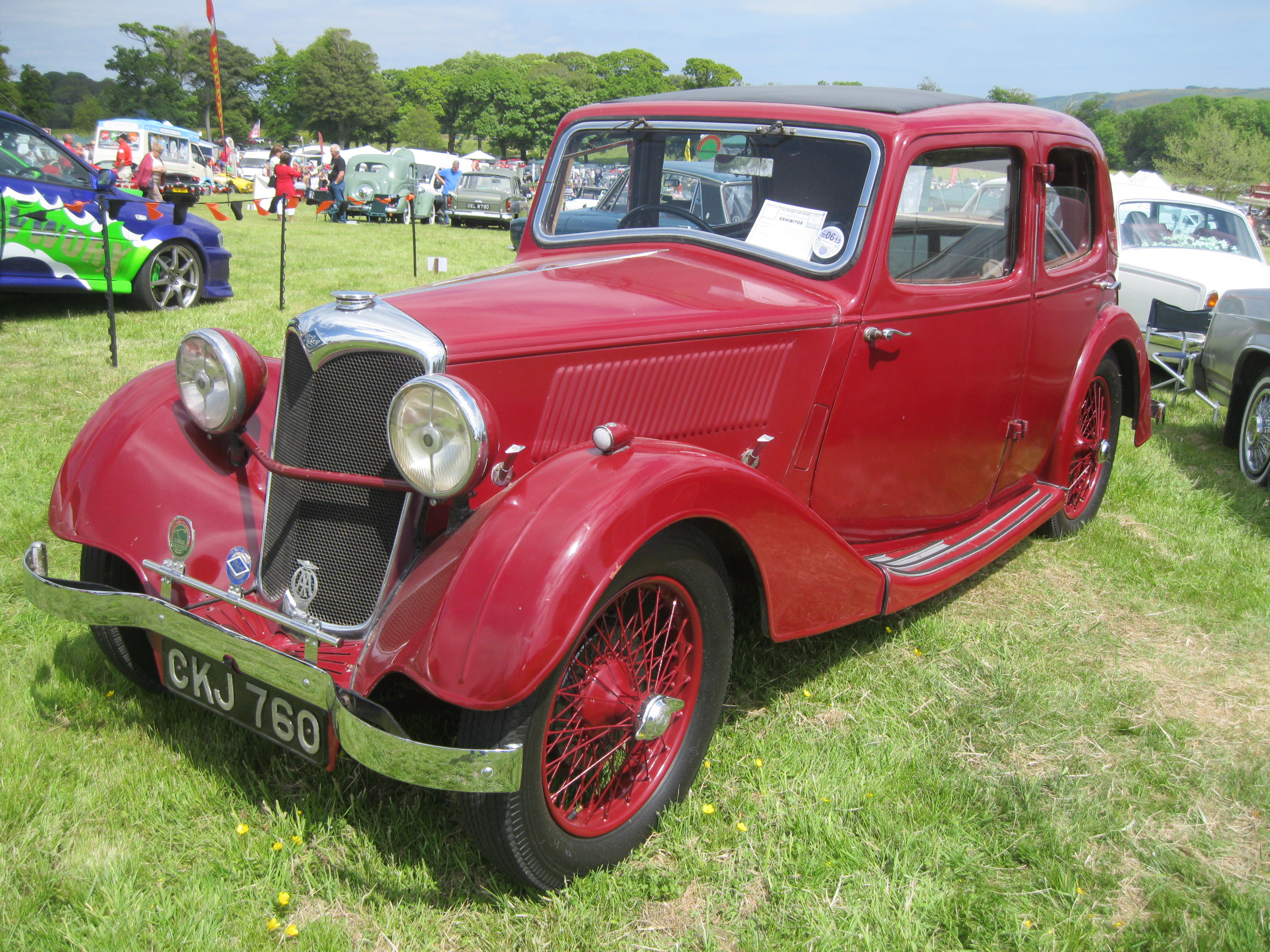
1935 Merlin

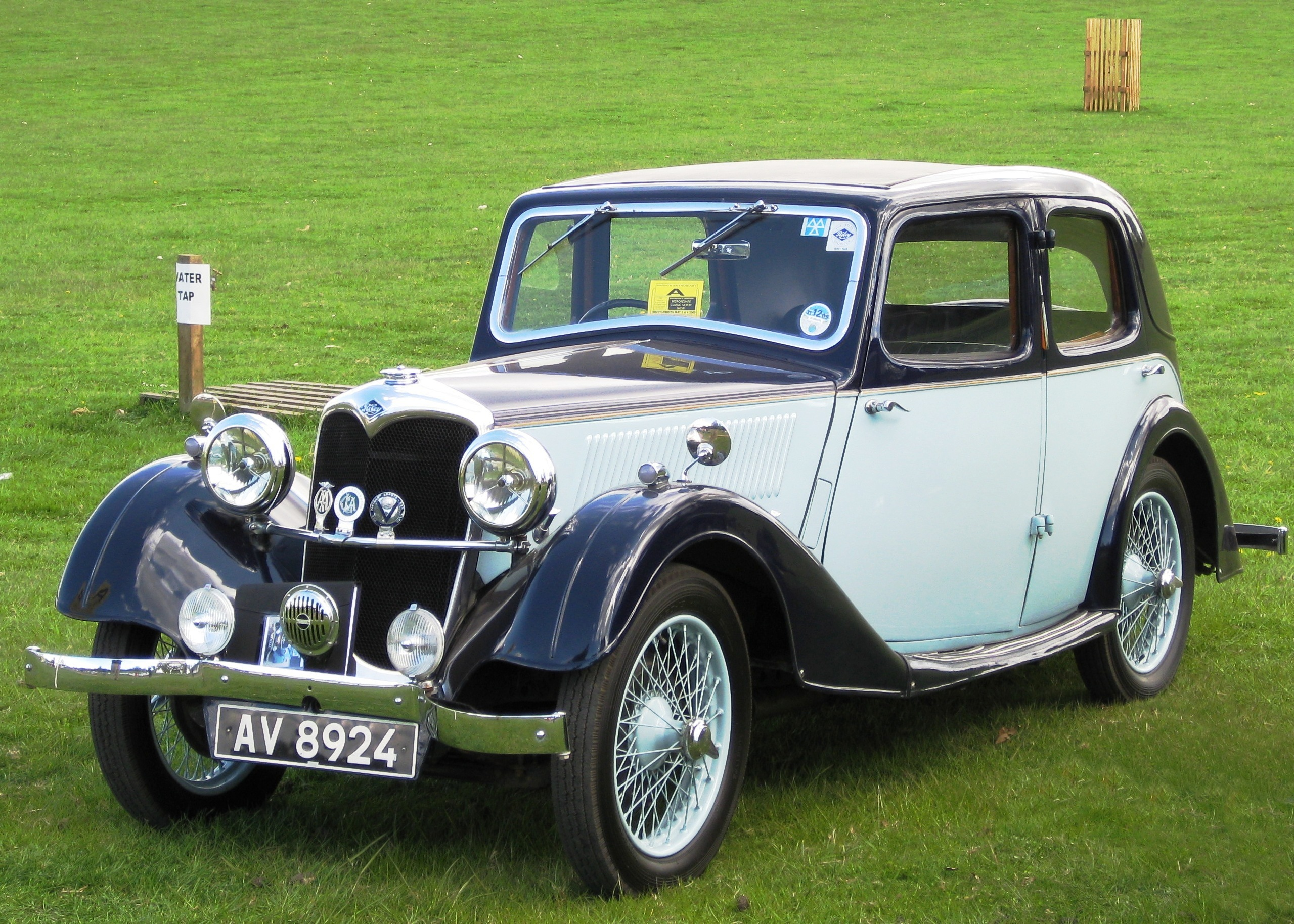
1937 Merlin (all steel)

Open two-seaters

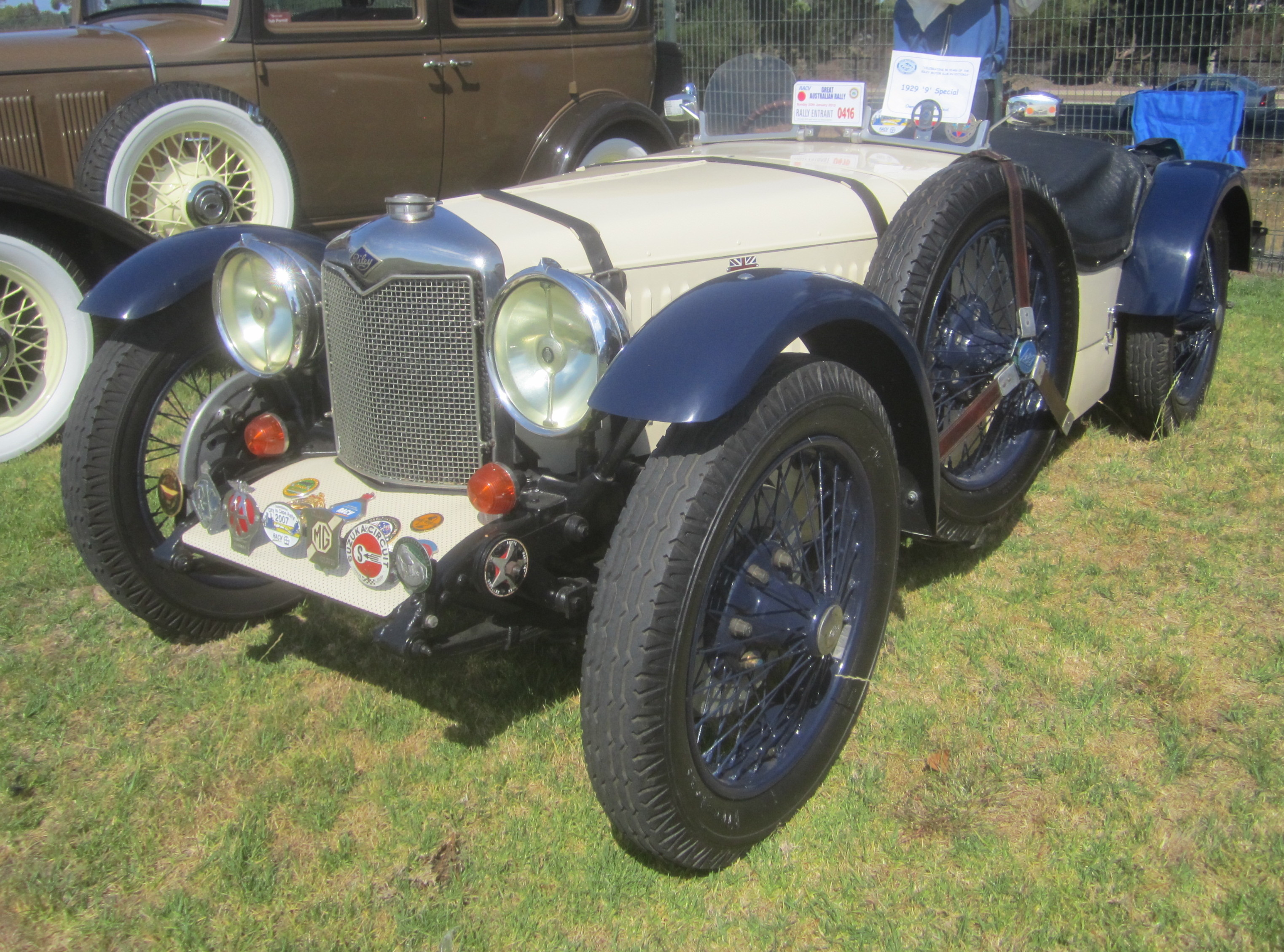
1929 Speed

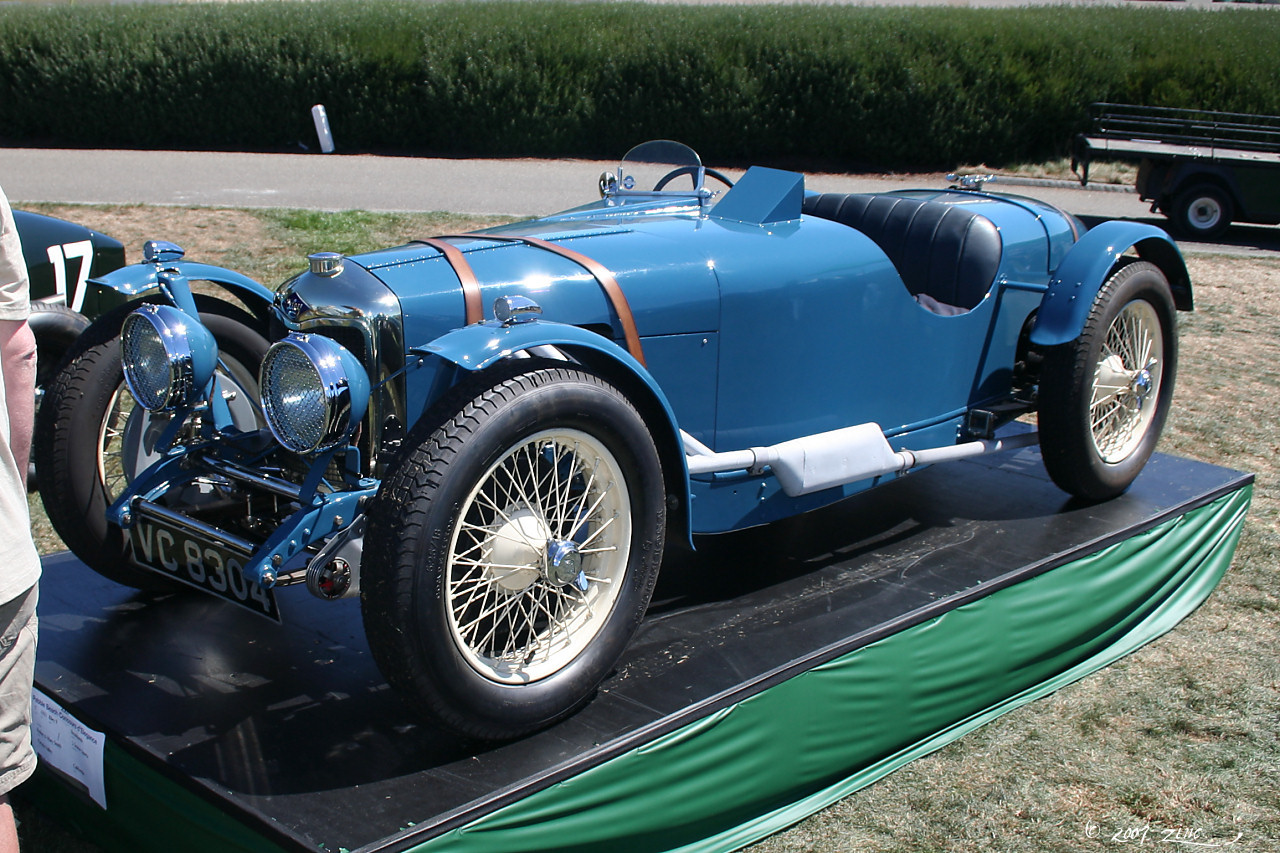
1931 Brooklands

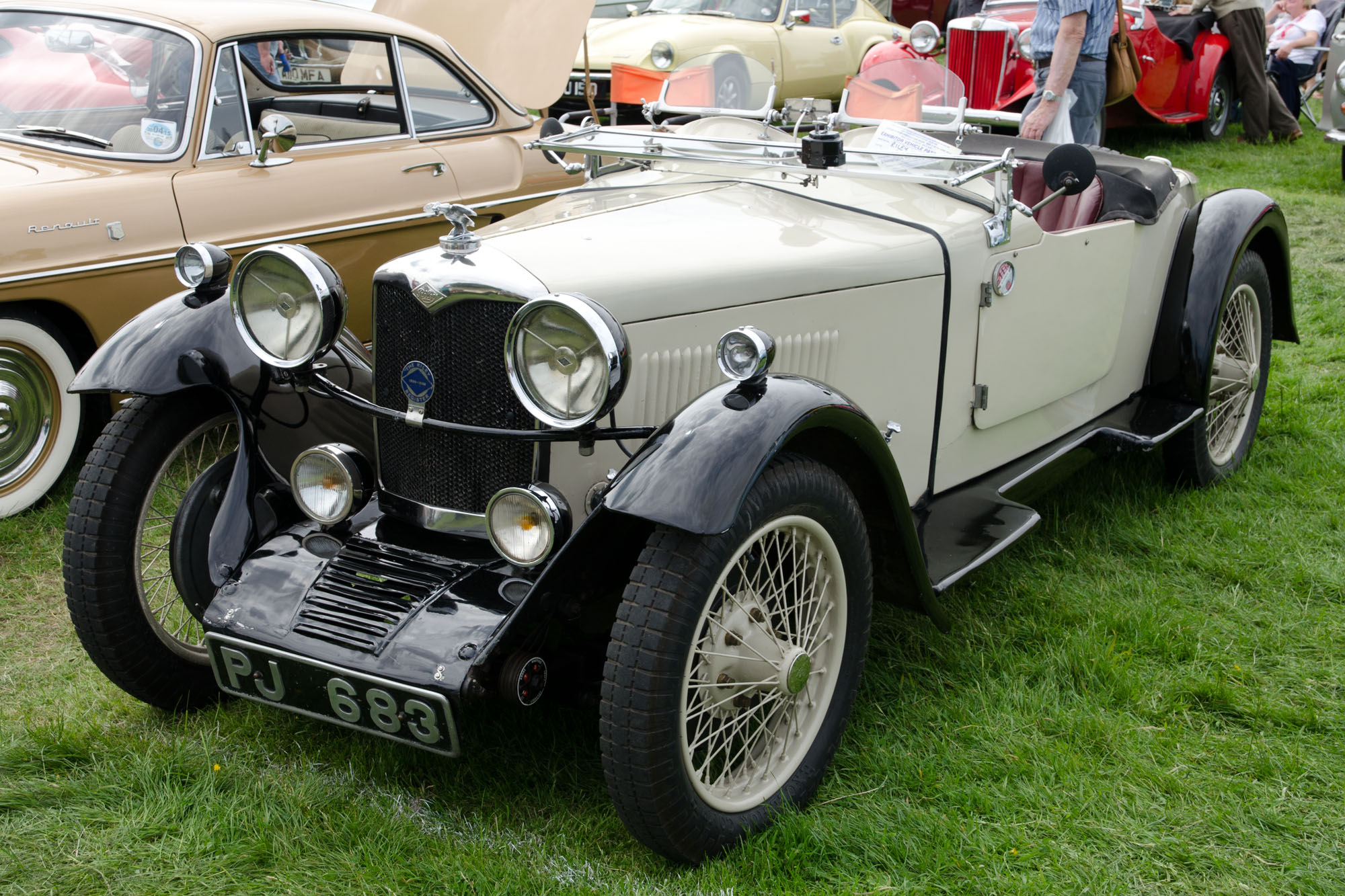
1931 Gamecock

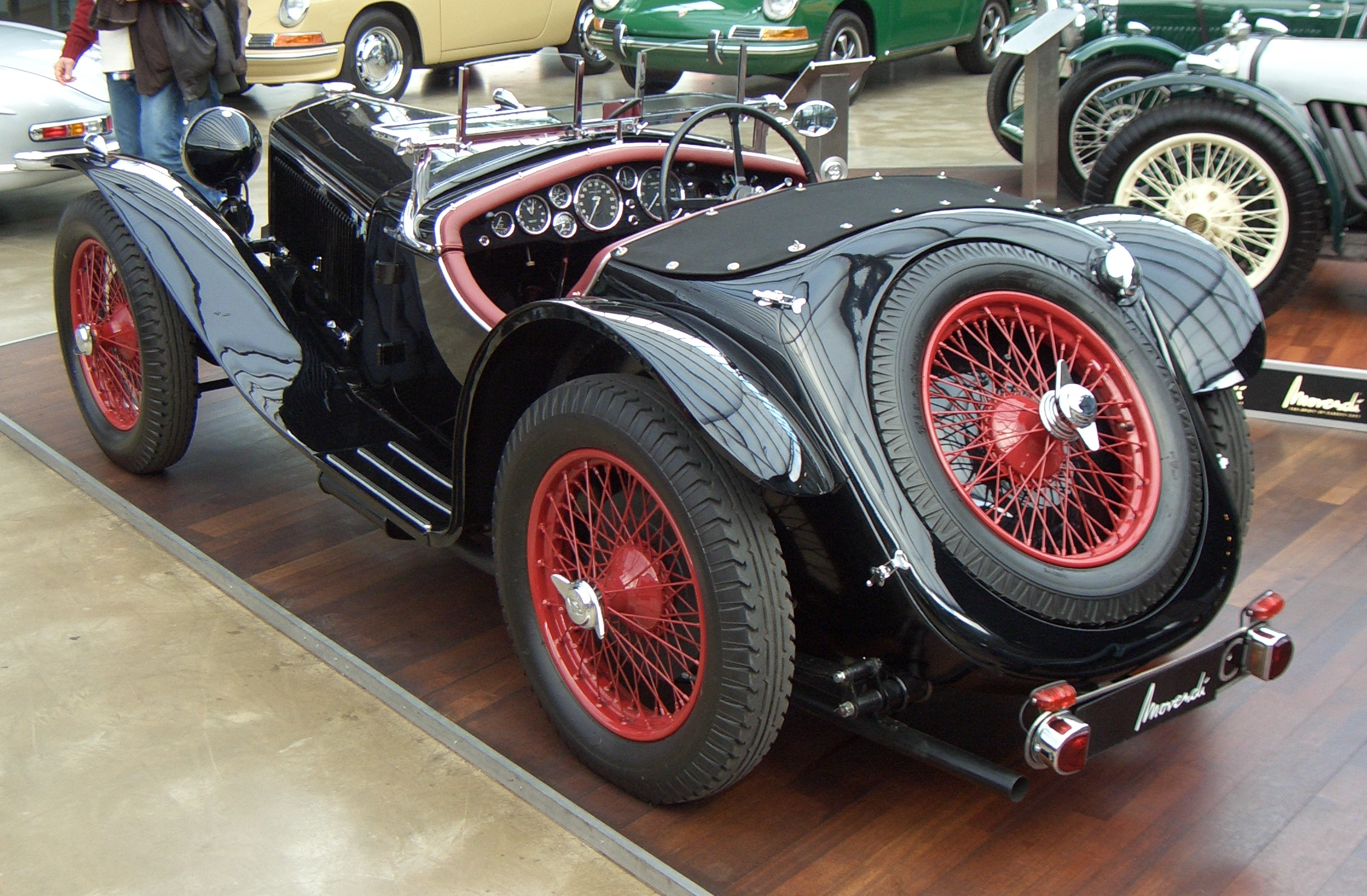
Imp (1934-1935)

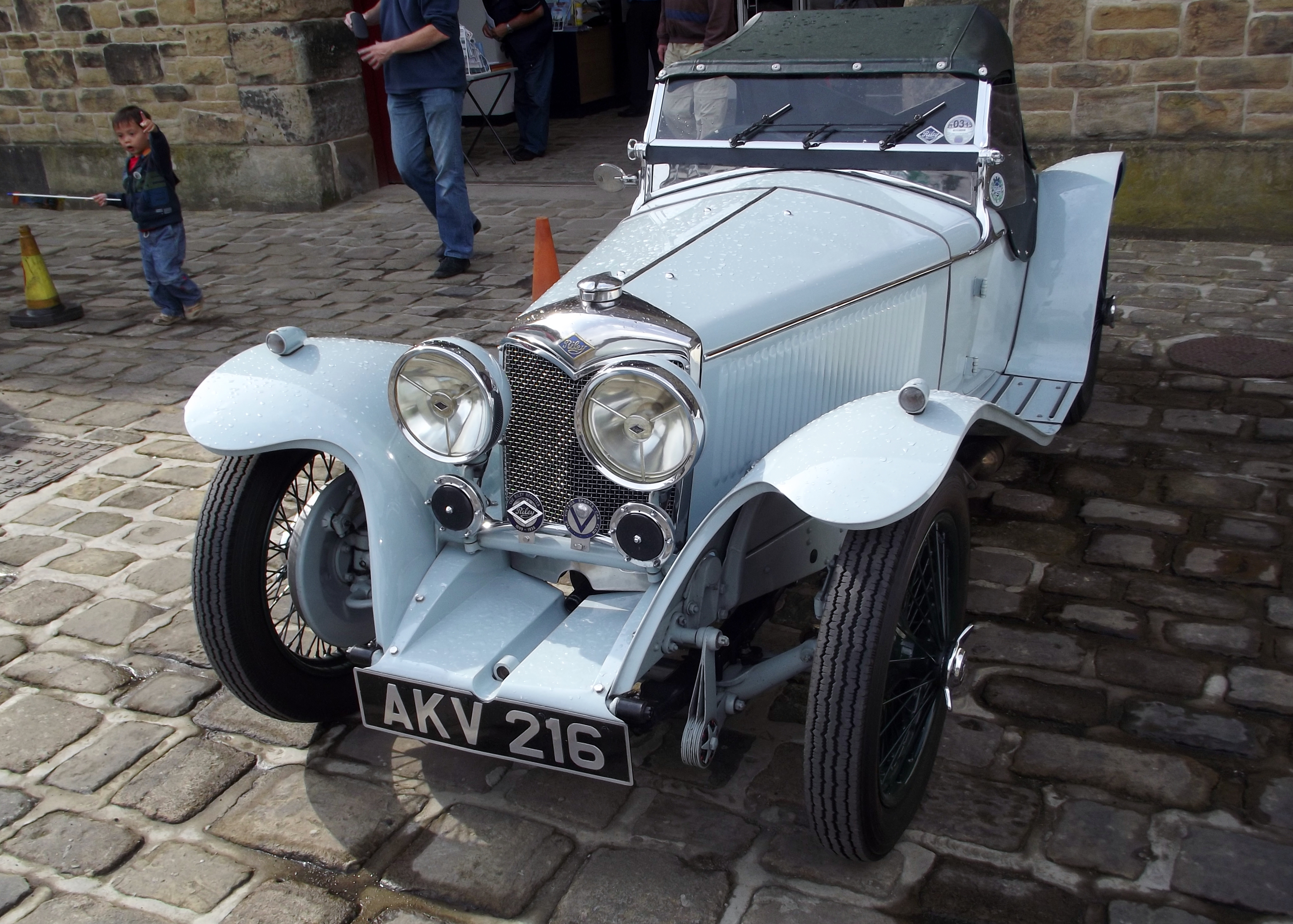
1935 Imp

Tourers

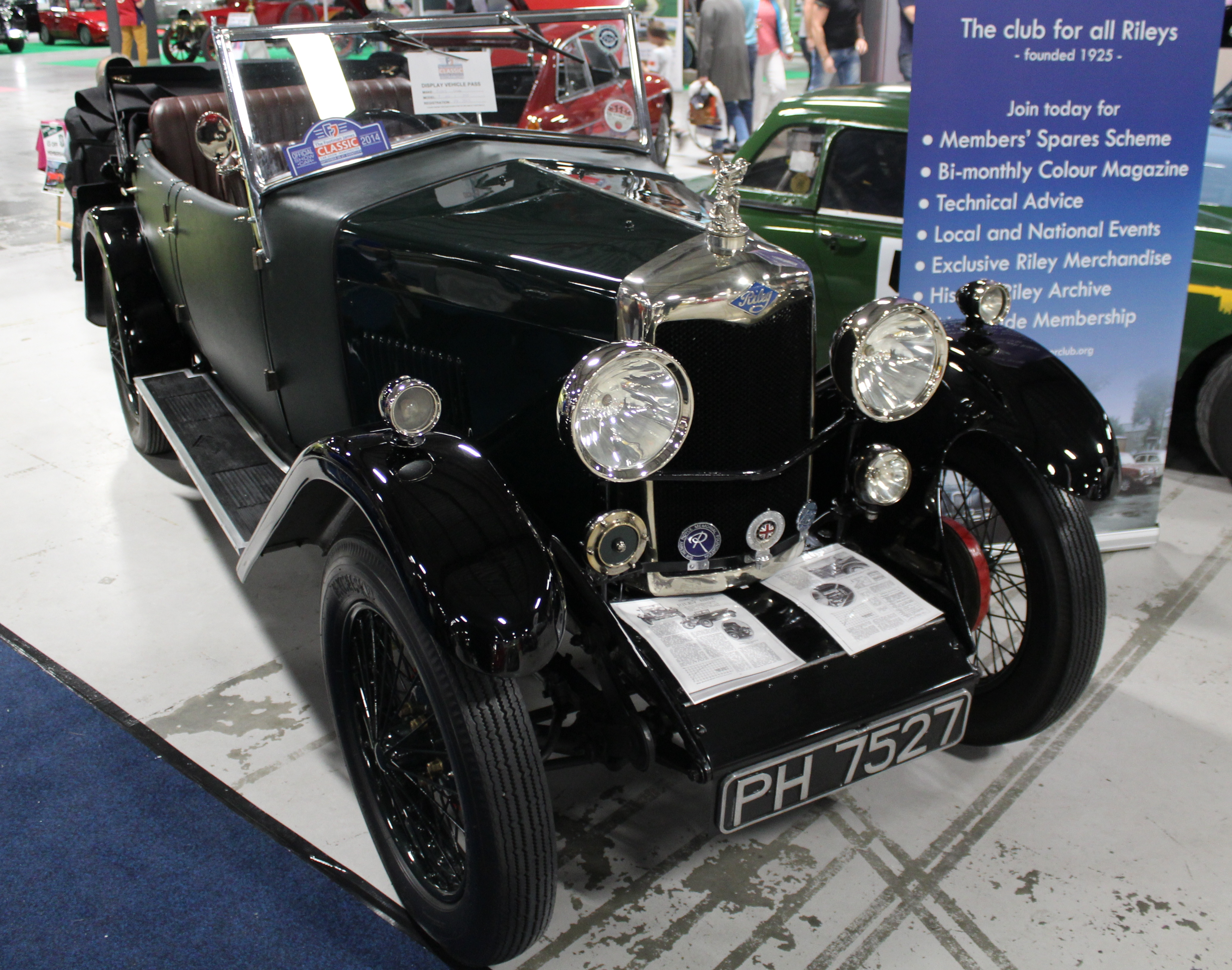
1928 Special 4-door tourer (fabric)

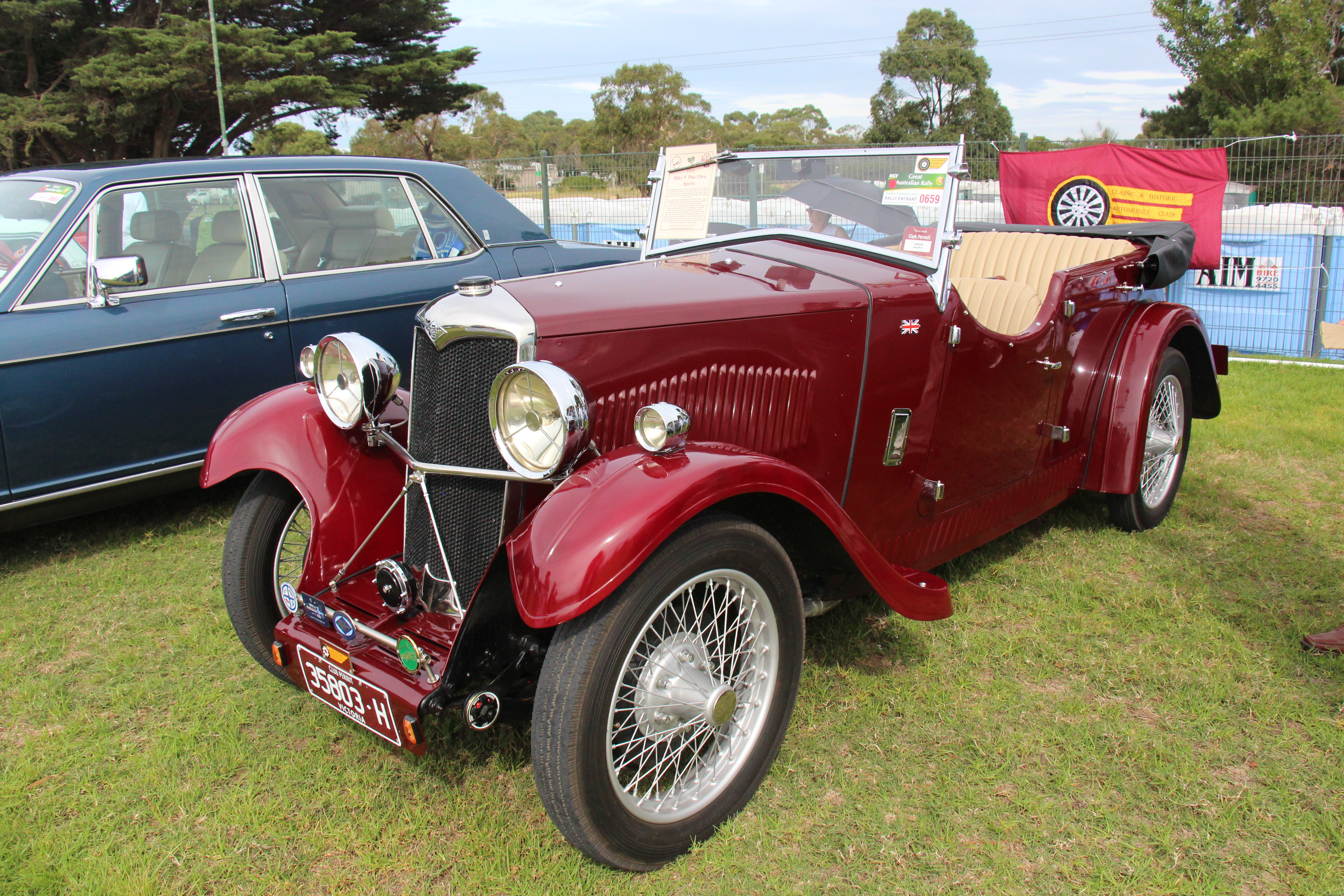
1934 Plus Ultra

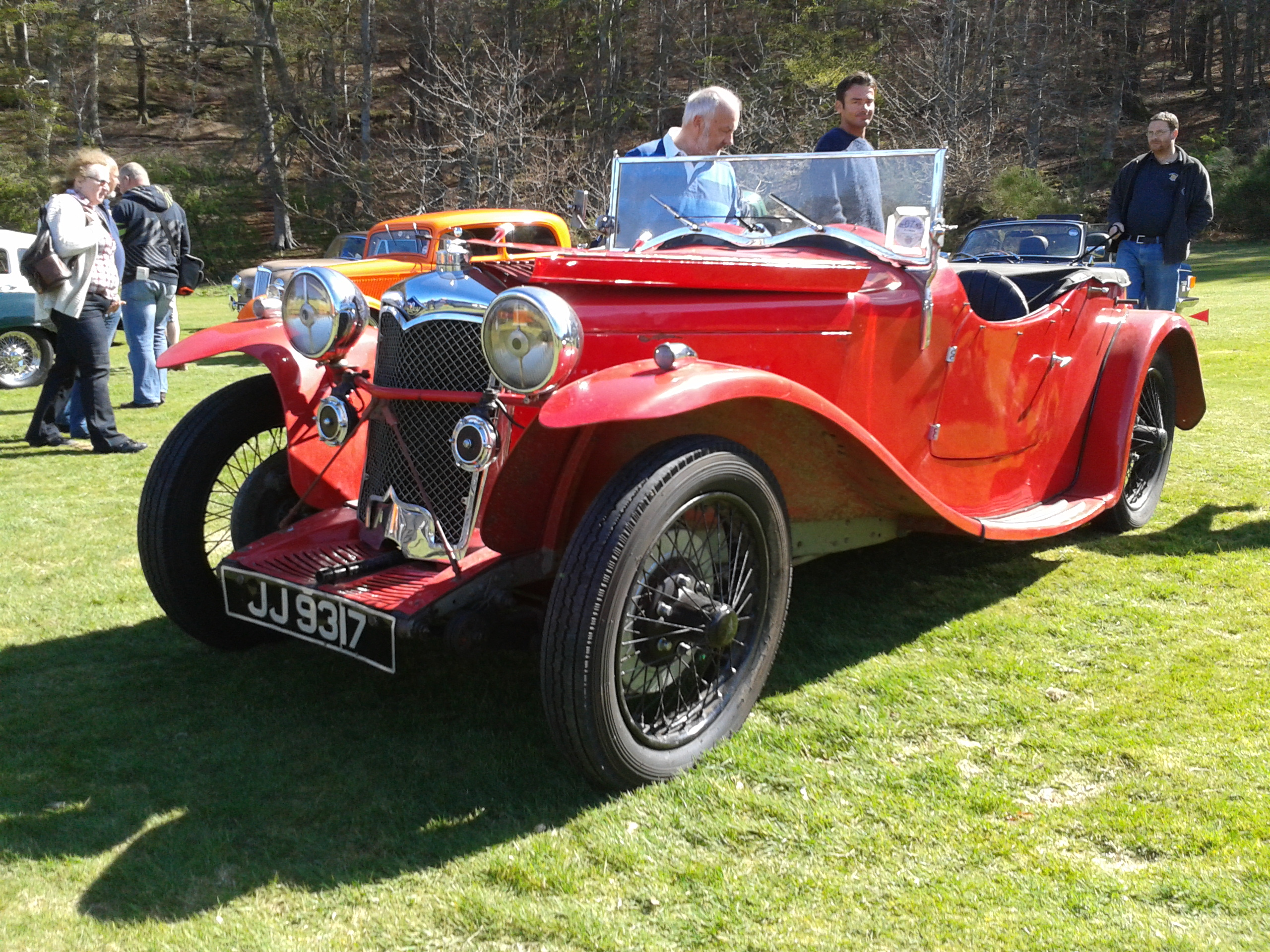
1933 March special

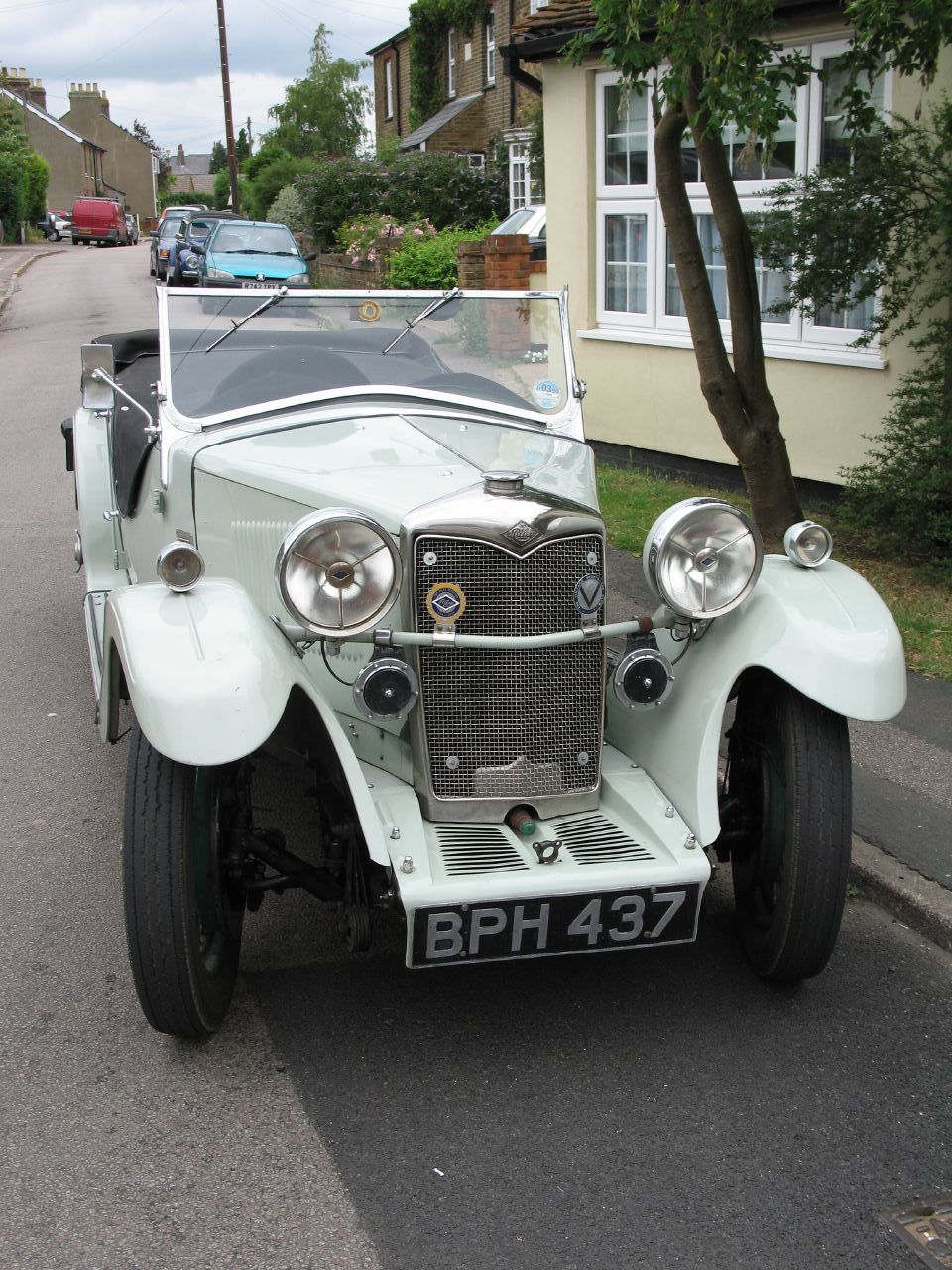
1934 Gloucester special

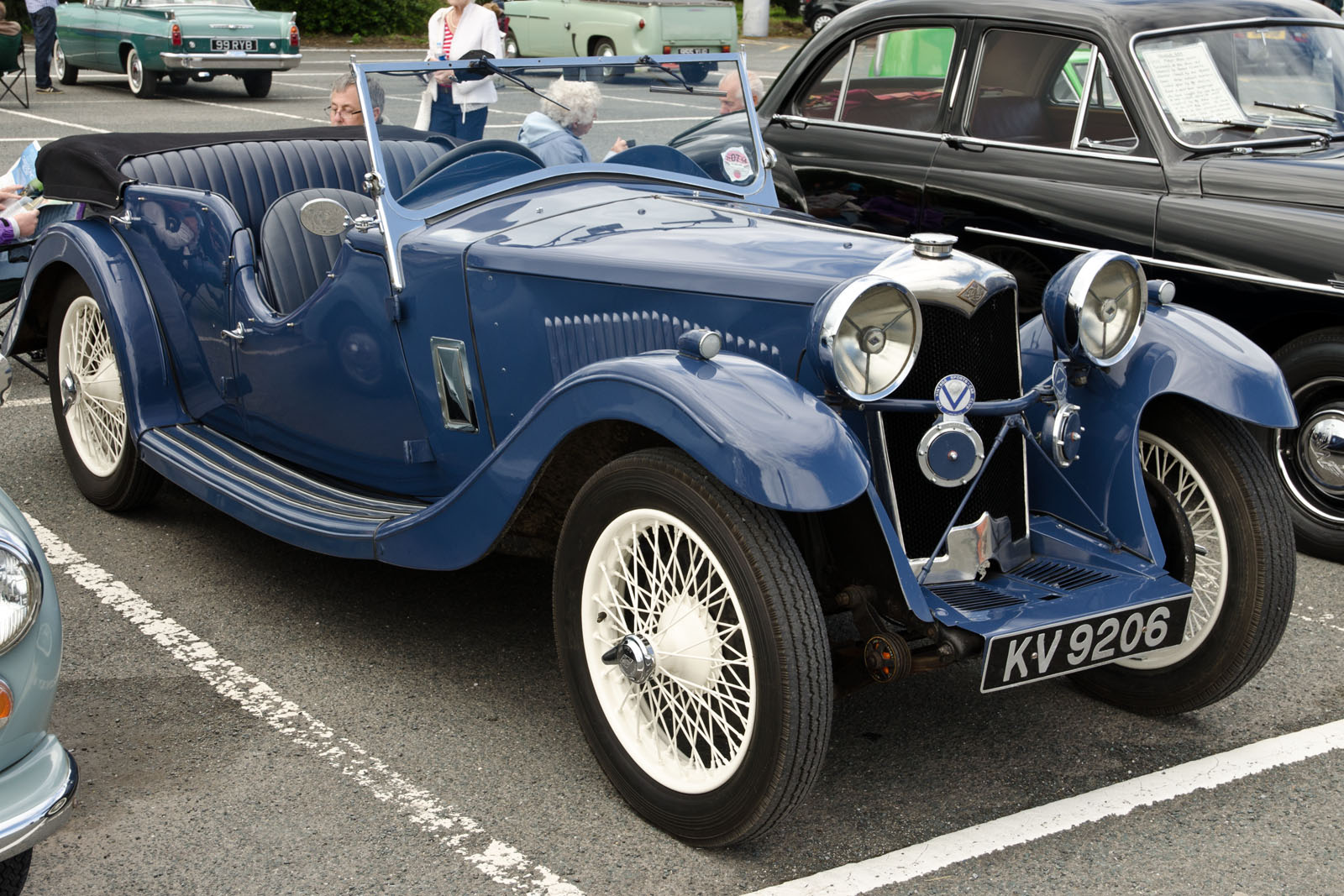
1934 Lynx

== Hindsight ==
When compared with the contemporary Hillman Minx it had a 1098 cc engine with hemispherical combustion chambers pumping out more than 25 per cent more horsepower than the 1185 cc Hillman. The Riley's ENV preselector gearbox provided progress through the gears. The Riley had a competition record and was adding to it. The Riley body was composite wood and metal, coachbuilt, and a style-leader — fabric top, centre-lock wire wheels. The pressed steel Hillman body, ordinary. The Minx body rusted, the Monaco body rotted. Hillmans outsold Rileys better than 4.5:1

But a Monaco was nearly double the price of a Minx. While the Monaco's handling was much better there was not a lot of difference in performance, the Minx was even slightly faster in a straight line. With a Riley "special series" twin carburettor engine you might reach 70 mph or 112 km/h. A 1931 Monaco weighed 916 kg, a 1937 model 1 160 kg. In spite of its standard twin carburettors the 1937 Monaco took half a minute to reach 50 mph and could barely exceed 62 mph or 100 km/h.

== See also ==
- Riley-Ford 3.3-litre Special
