= 1929 Australian Grand Prix =

Race details
- Date: 18 March 1929
- Location: Phillip Island, Victoria
- Course: Temporary road circuit
- Course length: 10.6 km (6.5 miles)
- Distance: 31 laps, 332 km (206 miles)

Podium
First	(Australia) Arthur Terdich	Bugatti
Second	(Australia) Reg Brearley	Bugatti
Third	(Australia) Bill Lowe	Lombard

The 1929 Australian Grand Prix was a motor race held at the Phillip Island circuit in Victoria, Australia on 18 March 1929. The race, which was organised by the Victorian Light Car Club, had 27 entries and 22 starters. It is recognised by Motorsport Australia as the second Australian Grand Prix.

The race was won by Arthur Terdich driving a Bugatti Type 37A.

== Classes ==
Cars competed in four classes:

- Class A: Under 900cc
- Class B: 901cc - 1100cc
- Class C: 1101cc - 1500cc
- Class D: 1501cc - 2000cc

== Race format ==
Class B cars started the race first followed by the Class A entries thirty seconds later. Class C cars started next, the first group four minutes after the Class A cars and the remainder thirty seconds after that. The Class D cars were the last to start, thirty seconds after the Class C cars.

The winner of the Grand Prix was to be the entry, irrespective of class, which made the fastest time for the race.

== Classification ==
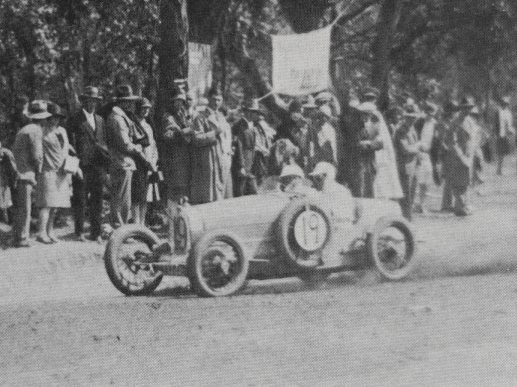
Arthur Terdich driving a Bugatti Type 37A to victory in the race

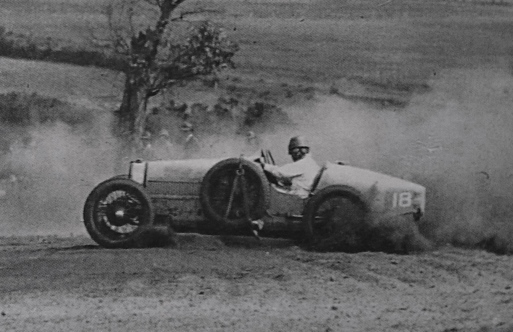
The Bugatti Type 37 of Reg Brearley contesting the race. Brearley placed second.

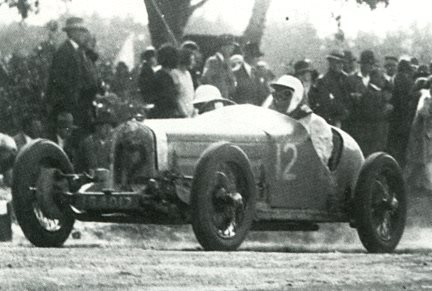
Bill Lowe placed third driving a Lombard AL3

Barney Dentry (Sénéchal), seen here during a pitstop, placed sixth.

Pos.	No.	Class	Driver	Car	Entrant	Laps	Time
1	19	C	Arthur Terdich	Bugatti Type 37A s/c	A. Terdich	31	3h 14m 22 1/5 s
2	18	C	Reg Brearley	Bugatti Type 37	R. Rearley	31	3h 29m 43s
3	12	B	Bill Lowe	Lombard AL3	W. H. Lowe	31	3h 31m 55 3/5 s
4	28	D	Harry Jenkins	Bugatti Type 30	H. Jenkins	31	3h 43m 48s
5	20	C	John Bernadou	Bugatti Type 23 Brescia	A. W. Bernadou	31	3h 49m 14 3/5 s
6	11	B	Barney Dentry	Sénéchal	G. Dentry	31	3h 51m 16 1/5 s
7	25	D	Cyril Dickason	Austin 12	A. Waite	31	4h 1m 16s
8	3	A	Wally Robertson	Austin 7	W. R. M. Robertson	31	4h 12m 1 1/2 s
9	26	D	John McCutcheon	Morris Cowley	J. O. McCutcheon	31	4h 17m 6 1/5 s
10	1	A	Noel Langton	Austin 7	N. Langdon	31	4h 24m 55 2/5 s
NC	6	A	Ken Wallace-Crabbe	Austin 7	K. Wallace-Crabbe	?	
Ret	14	B	Bill Williamson	Riley Nine	Riley Distributors	23	
Ret	23	C	Albert Edwards	Alvis	A. Edwards	21	
Ret	2	A	Clarrie May	Austin 7 s/c	A. Waite	20	
Ret	10	B	Harold Drake Richmond	Fiat 509	H. Drake Richmond	20	
Ret	27	D	Ernie King	Th. Schneider	E. H. King	17	
Ret	5	A	Ron Gardner	Triumph Super 7	R. Gardner	13	
Ret	16	C	John Goodall	Aston Martin	J. Goodall	5	
Ret	15	B	W Albert "Ab" Terdich	Sénéchal	W. A. Terdich	4	
Ret	22	C	Bill Thompson	Bugatti Type 37	W. Thompson	2	
Ret	8	A	Ken McKinney	Austin 7	K. McKinney	1	
Ret	4	A	Robert Baker	Morris Minor	R. Baker	1	
DNS	9	B	George Saville	Amilcar	G. Saville		

- Wallace-Crabbe failed to complete the race distance within the prescribed time limit.

== Notes ==
- Average speed of winning car: 61.7 miles an hour

Preceded by 1928 Australian Grand Prix	Australian Grand Prix; 1929	Succeeded by 1930 Australian Grand Prix
