= 1928 Australian Grand Prix =

Race details
- Date: 31 March 1928
- Location: Phillip Island, Victoria
- Course: Temporary road circuit
- Course length: 10.6 km (6.5 miles)
- Distance: 16 laps, 169 km (105 miles)
- Weather: Sunny

Podium
First	(Australia) Arthur Waite	Austin
Second	(Australia) John McCutcheon	Morris
Third	(Australia) Cyril Dickason	Austin

The 1928 Australian Grand Prix was a motor race held on the Phillip Island road circuit, on Phillip Island, Victoria, Australia on 31 March 1928. Although now known as the first Australian Grand Prix, the race was actually staged as the 100 Miles Road Race and it did not assume the Australian Grand Prix title until some years later. It was organised by the Victorian Light Car Club.

The overall winner was Arthur Waite driving an Austin 7. The winning car averaged 56.25 mph (90.50 km/h).

== Race summary ==
The race was originally to be held on Monday 26 March however rain forced postponement until Saturday 31 March. It was open to "light" cars of up to 2-litre capacity and it attracted 30 entries, of which 25 were accepted and 17 started.

Competing cars were classified into classes according to cylinder capacity:

- Class A: Cars up to 750cc
- Class B: Cars over 750cc and up to 1100cc
- Class C: Cars over 1100cc and up to 1500cc
- Class D: Cars over 1500cc and up to 2000cc

The event was conducted as two separate races, with the first held in the morning for Class B and D entries, and the second held in the afternoon, for Class A and C cars. The competitor setting the fastest time was to receive a £100 trophy donated by Charles Brown Kellow and would be regarded as "Champion of the Day". Trophies were also to be awarded for first and second places in each class and all other competitors who finished within the 2½ hour time limit would receive a Club award.

Only two cars completed the course without stopping. They were the Morris Cowley of J. O. McCutcheon and the Austin 12 of C. R. Dickason.

== Race results ==
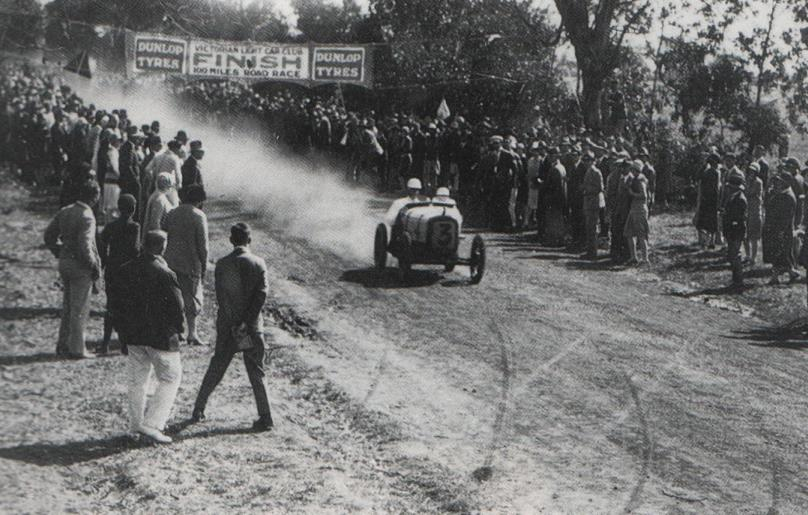
Arthur Waite was the overall winner driving an Austin 7. He also won Class A.

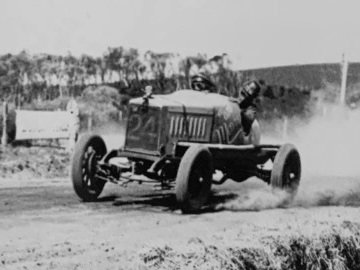
John McCutcheon placed second overall and won Class D driving a Morris Cowley

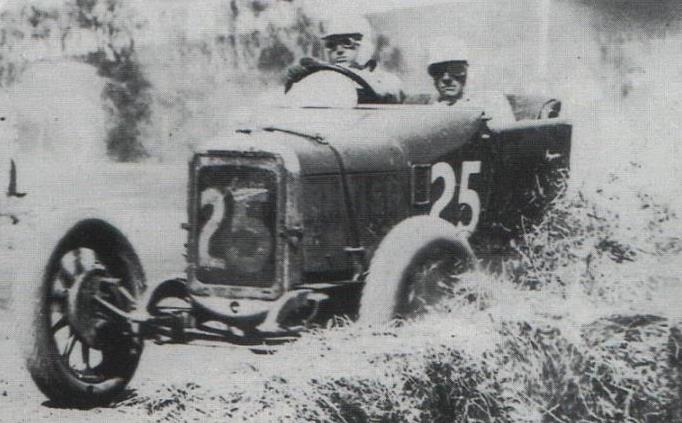
Cyril Dickason placed third overall driving an Austin 12

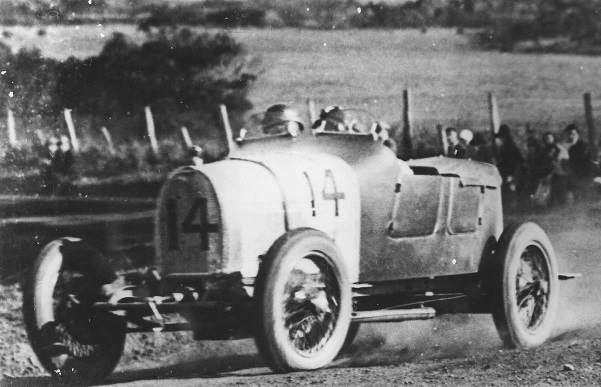
Arthur Terdich placed fourth and won Class C driving a Bugatti Type 40

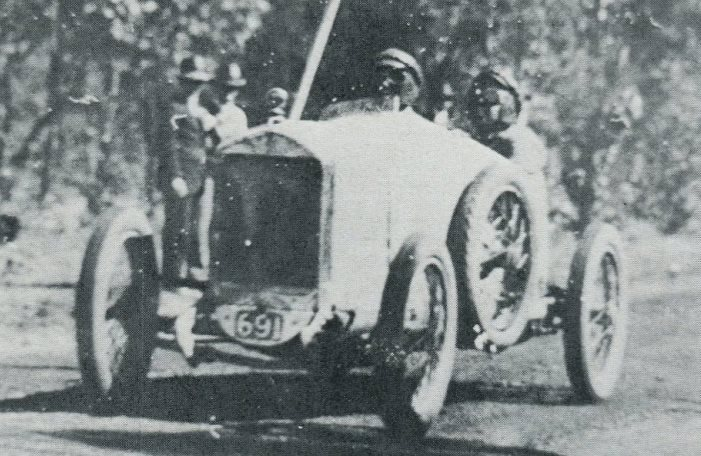
Barney Dentry placed fifth and won Class B driving a Sénéchal

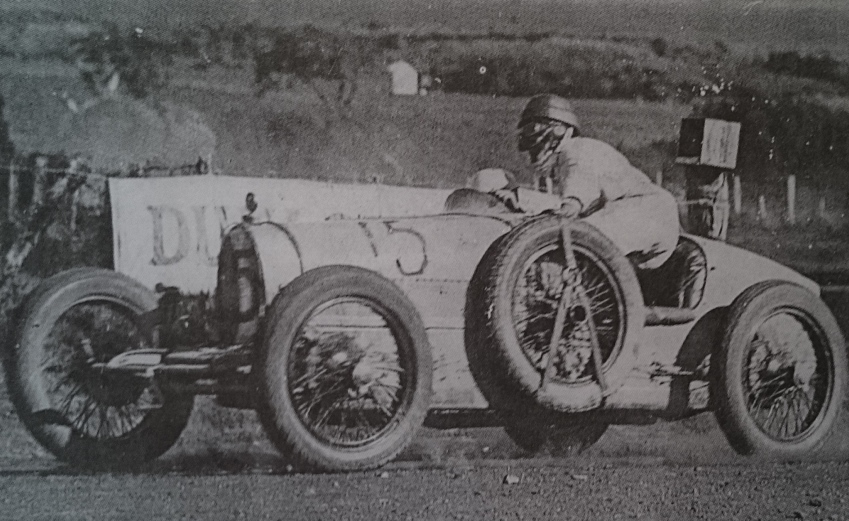
Jack Day placed sixth driving a Bugatti Type 37

=== Race One ===
Pos	Driver	No.	Car	Entrant	Class	Laps	Time
1	John McCutcheon	24	Morris Cowley	J. O. McCutcheon	D	16	1h 50m 10s
2	Cyril Dickason	25	Austin 12	C. R. Dickason	D	16	1h 54m 02s
3	Barney Dentry	10	Sénéchal	G. Dentry	B	16	1h 55m 44s
4	Bill Lowe	26	Métallurgique	W. H. Lowe	D	16	2h 05m 01s
5	Bill Williamson	8	Riley Nine	Mrs J. A. Day	B	16	2h 17m 37s
6	Les Pound	7	DFP	L. Pound	B	16	2h 24m 29s
Ret	W. A. "Ab" Terdich	6	DFP	W. A. Terdich	B	10	
Ret	Les Jennings	23	Morris Cowley	L. Jennings	D	6	
DNS	B. W. Solly	9	Opel	Rex Motors P/L	B	-	
DNS	Maurice Shmith	11	Fiat 509	M. Shmith	B	-	
DNS	George Saville	12	Amilcar Grand Sport	G. Saville	B	-	
DNS	John Hollway	22	Darracq	J. Hollway	D	-	

=== Race Two ===
Pos	Driver	No.	Car	Entrant	Class	Laps	Time
1	(Australia) Arthur Waite	3	Austin 7 s/c	A. Waite	A	16	1h 46m 40s
2	(Australia) Arthur Terdich	14	Bugatti Type 40	A. J. Terdich	C	16	1h 54m 45s
3	Jack Day	15	Bugatti Type 37	J. A. Day	C	16	1h 56m 26s
4	Clarrie May	5	Austin 7	C. May	A	16	2h 03m 24s
5	J. C. Hutton	16	Alvis 12/50	J. C. Hutton	C	16	2h 04m 21s
6	Tom Davey	2	Austin 7	T. N. Davey	A	16	2h 06m 19s
7	Stan King	1	Austin 7	S. V. King	A	16	2h 08m 35s
Ret	Ron Gardner	17	Alvis 12/50	R. G. Gardner	C	8	
Ret	Ed Houn	18	Aston Martin	J. E. Goodall	C	1	
DNS	Albert Edwards	4	Austin 7	A. Edwards	A	-	
DNS	Ed Hussey Cooper	19	Frazer Nash	E. H. Cooper	C	-	
DNS	Sid Cox	20	Bugatti Type 39	S. C. Cox	C	-	
DNS	G. A. Wagner	21	Wanderer	G. A. Wagner	C	-	

=== Overall classification ===
Pos	Driver	No.	Car	Entrant	Class	Laps	Time
1	(Australia) Arthur Waite	3	Austin 7 s/c	A. Waite	A	16	1h 46m 40s
2	John McCutcheon	24	Morris Cowley	J. O. McCutcheon	D	16	1h 50m 10s
3	Cyril Dickason	25	Austin 12	C. R. Dickason	D	16	1h 54m 02s
4	(Australia) Arthur Terdich	14	Bugatti Type 40	A. J. Terdich	C	16	1h 54m 45s
5	Barney Dentry	10	Sénéchal	G. Dentry	B	16	1h 55m 44s
6	Jack Day	15	Bugatti Type 37	J. A. Day	C	16	1h 56m 26s
7	Clarrie May	5	Austin 7	C. May	A	16	2h 03m 24s
8	J. C. Hutton	16	Alvis 12/50	J. C. Hutton	C	16	2h 04m 21s
9	Bill Lowe	26	Métallurgique	W. H. Lowe	D	16	2h 05m 01s
10	Tom Davey	2	Austin 7	T. N. Davey	A	16	2h 06m 19s
11	Stan King	1	Austin 7	S. V. King	A	16	2h 08m 35s
12	Bill Williamson	8	Riley Nine	Mrs J. A. Day	B	16	2h 17m 37s
13	Les Pound	7	DFP	L. Pound	B	16	2h 24m 29s
Ret	W. A. "Ab" Terdich	6	DFP	W. A. Terdich	B	10	
Ret	Ron Gardner	17	Alvis 12/50	R. G. Gardner	C	8	
Ret	Les Jennings	23	Morris Cowley	L. Jennings	D	6	
Ret	Ed Houn	18	Aston Martin	J. E. Goodall	C	1	
DNS	Albert Edwards	4	Austin 7	A. Edwards	A	-	
DNS	B. W. Solly	9	Opel	Rex Motors P/L	B	-	
DNS	Maurice Shmith	11	Fiat 509	M. Shmith	B	-	
DNS	George Saville	12	Amilcar Grand Sport	G. Saville	B	-	
DNS	Ed Hussey Cooper	19	Frazer Nash	E. H. Cooper	C	-	
DNS	Sid Cox	20	Bugatti Type 39	S. C. Cox	C	-	
DNS	G. A. Wagner	21	Wanderer	G. A. Wagner	C	-	
DNS	John Hollway	22	Darracq	J. Hollway	D	-	

=== Notes ===
- Ret = Retired from race
- DNS = Did not start race

== 1927 Australian Grand Prix ==
Although the 1928 race is recognised by Motorsport Australia as the first Australian Grand Prix, a dispute exists given that an event held in Goulburn, New South Wales in 1927 was actually advertised as a grand prix at the time. However the 1927 event was not a motor race but rather a series of elimination sprints.

Preceded by None	Australian Grand Prix; 1928	Succeeded by 1929 Australian Grand Prix
