= BMW 3/15 =

The BMW 3/15 was BMW's first car, produced in its first version as a "Dixi" between 1927 and 1929 and then, following BMW's acquisition of the Automobilwerk Eisenach business in October 1928, in three subsequent versions as BMWs from July 1929 till March 1932, when BMW gave up the licence under which the Austin designed cars were produced.

9,307 Dixi 3/15s were manufactured between 1927 and 1929, which was almost as many cars as all the earlier Dixi models together.

18,976 BMW 3/15s were manufactured between 1929 and 1932.

== 3/15 DA-1 ==
Dixi 3/15 DA-1
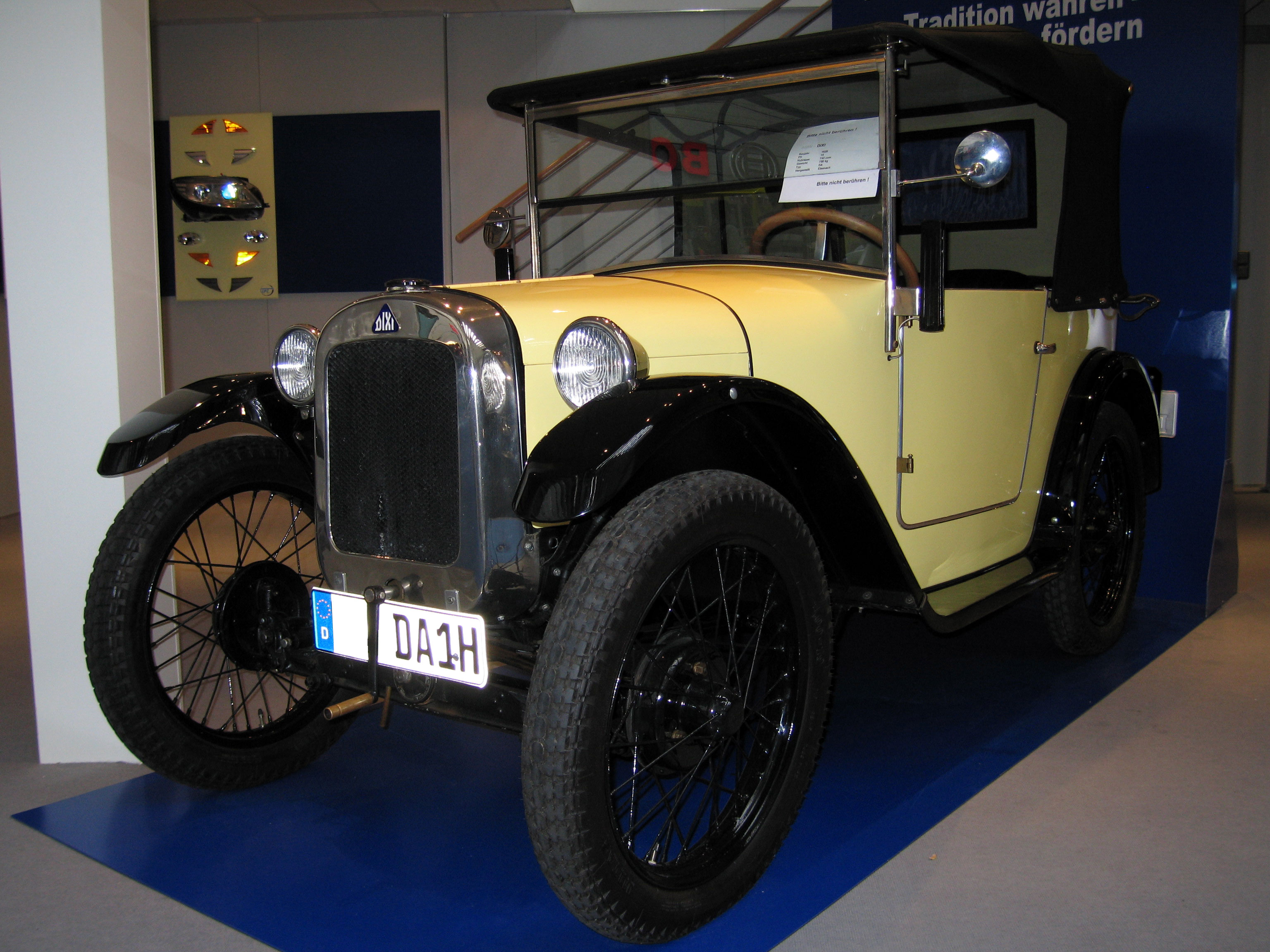

Overview
- Manufacturer: Fahrzeugfabrik Eisenach; Bayerische Motoren Werke AG (BMW)
- Also called: Dixi 3/15 PS DA-1
- Production: 1927–1929
- Assembly: Germany: Eisenach

Body and chassis
- Layout: FR layout
- Related: Austin 7

Powertrain
- Engine: 747 cc side valve I4
- Transmission: 3-speed manual

Dimensions
- Wheelbase: 75 in (1,905 mm)
- Kerb weight: approx. 400 kg (882 lb) (laden weight)

Chronology
- Successor: BMW 3/15 DA-2

In 1927, Fahrzeugfabrik Eisenach, which manufactured automobiles under the Dixi marque, entered a contract with the Austin Motor Company to manufacture the Austin Seven under licence. The first fifty Eisenach-built Sevens were right-hand-drive cars assembled in September 1927 from parts provided by Austin's factory in Longbridge. By December 1927, Dixi had begun building their version of the Seven, the left-hand-drive Dixi 3/15 PS DA-1, built from parts made by Dixi. The 3/15 designation was derived from a taxable power rating of 3 PS with an actual power output of approximately 15 PS (11 kW). The DA-1 designation stood for Erste Deutsche Ausführung ("First German Version").

The main differences between the BMW Dixi 3/15 DA-1 and the contemporary Austin Seven were the addition of Bosch shock absorbers, the placement of the driver's controls on the left side of the vehicle, and the use of metric fasteners.

- Top speed: 75 km/h (47 mph)
- Acceleration 8 to 40 km/h (5 to 25 mph) in 10 seconds
- Fuel consumption: appr. 5.5 L/100 km (51 mpg_{‑imp}; 43 mpg_{‑US})

BMW bought Fahrzeugfabrik Eisenach from parent company Gothaer Waggonfabrik in October 1928. As a result, the Dixi 3/15 PS DA-1, when upgraded for 1929 became the BMW Dixi 3/15 DA-2 or, increasingly, simply as the BMW 3/15 DA-2.

== 3/15 DA-2 ==
BMW (Dixi) 3/15 DA-2 BMW Wartburg DA-3 BMW 3/15 DA-4
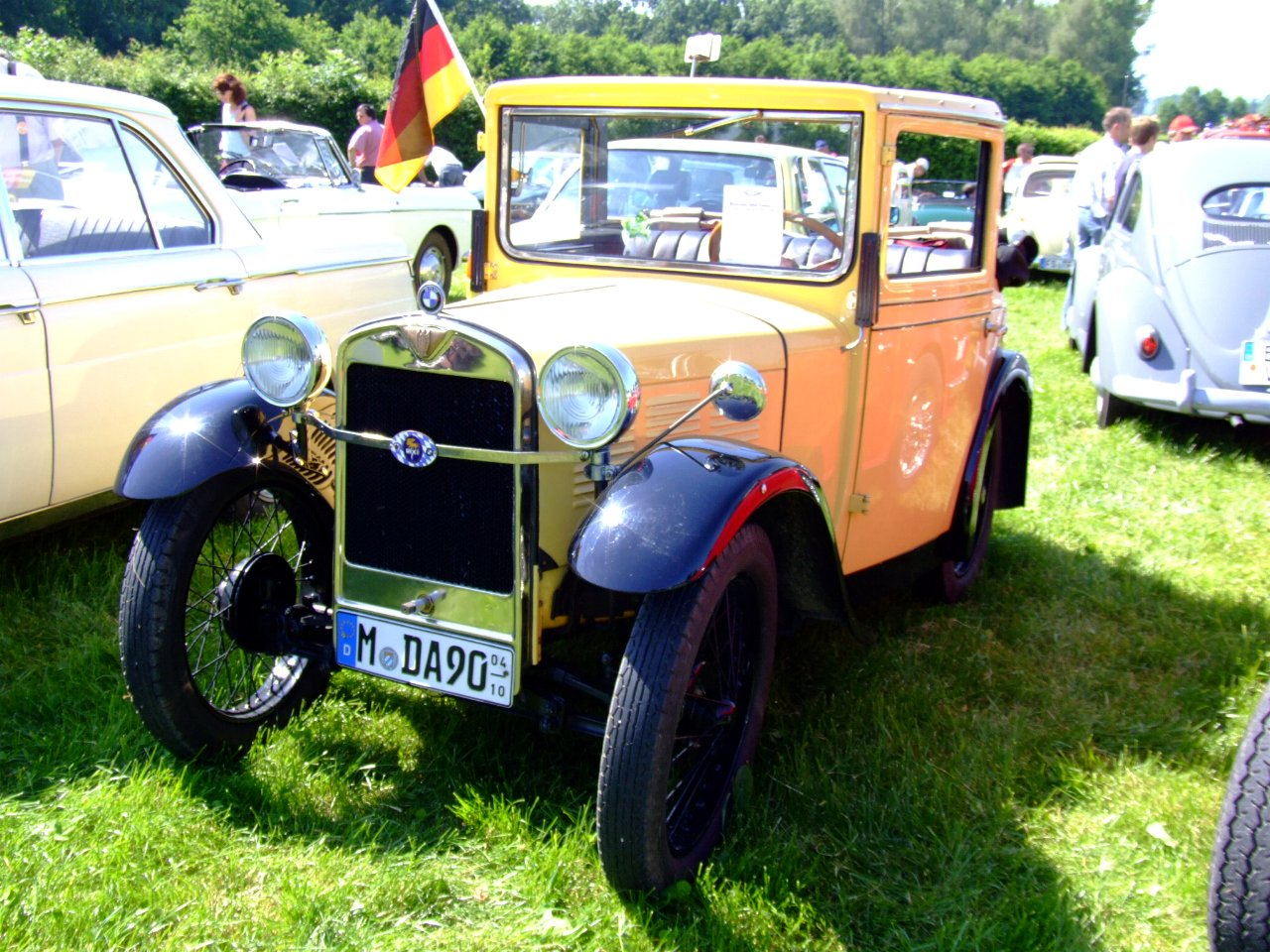
- 1930 BMW 3/15 DA-2

Overview
- Manufacturer: Fahrzeugfabrik Eisenach; Bayerische Motoren Werke AG (BMW)
- Production: 1929–1931 (BMW DA-2); 1930–1931 (BMW DA-3 Wartburg); 1931–1932 (BMW DA-4)
- Assembly: Germany: Eisenach

Body and chassis
- Layout: FR layout
- Related: Austin 7

Powertrain
- Engine: 747 cc side valve I4
- Transmission: 3-speed manual

Dimensions
- Wheelbase: 1,905 mm (75 in)
- Length: 3,000 mm (120 in) (DA-2 & DA-4)
- Width: 1,275 mm (50.2 in) (DA-2 & DA-4)
- Height: 1,625 mm (64.0 in) (DA-2 & DA-4)
- Kerb weight: approx. 400 kg (882 lb) (laden weight)

Chronology
- Successor: BMW 3/20

The 3/15 DA-2 replaced the DA-1 in April 1929. The main change from the DA-1 was the operation of the foot brakes, controlled via cable linkage, now acting on all four wheels: brakes on the DA-1 had operated only the rear wheels. Other changes included larger tyres and a lower final drive ratio. There was no change in either the size or the claimed output and performance from the car's four cylinder four-stroke side-valve engine.

Available body styles included a steel-bodied two-door saloon, a two-seat convertible, and a delivery van.

== 3/15 DA-3 Wartburg ==
The 3/15 DA-3 Wartburg was a sports roadster version of the 3/15, and was consequently BMW's first sports car. A drop-centre front axle was used to lower the frame for a lower centre of gravity. The compression ratio of the engine was raised from 5.6:1 to 7.0:1, raising maximum output to 18 PS (13 kW) at 3500 rpm.

Despite sharing the wheelbase and track of the other models, the Wartburg bodied roadster was 100 mm (3.9 in) longer, 125 mm (4.9 in) narrower and at a height of just 1,300 mm (51 in), 325 mm (12.8 in) lower than the standard bodied DA-2 and DA-4 cars.

The Wartburg was introduced in 1930, at a time when the Great Depression had drastically reduced the market for sports cars. It was discontinued in 1931, after 150 had been sold.

== 3/15 DA-4 ==
The 3/15 DA-4 replaced the DA-2 in mid-February 1931.

While the engine, gearing, and chassis of the DA-4 were unchanged from the original Dixi 3/15 PS DA-1, the DA-4 was a step away from the original Austin design. The DA-4 was the first BMW automobile with independent front suspension, which used the ends of the transverse leaf spring to act as lower control arms, with further wheel location performed by two diagonal leading arms.

The DA-4 was heavier than the DA-2, and a larger wheel diameter was used to compensate for this.

The Austin-based 3/15 series was discontinued before the March 1932 expiration of BMW's licence to manufacture Austin Sevens. It was replaced by the BMW 3/20.
