= Arthur Waite =

Arthur Waite may refer to:

- A. E. Waite (Arthur Edward Waite, 1857–1942), scholarly mystic
- Arthur Waite (racing driver) (1894–1991), Australian racing driver
