= BMW Dixi =

Dixi
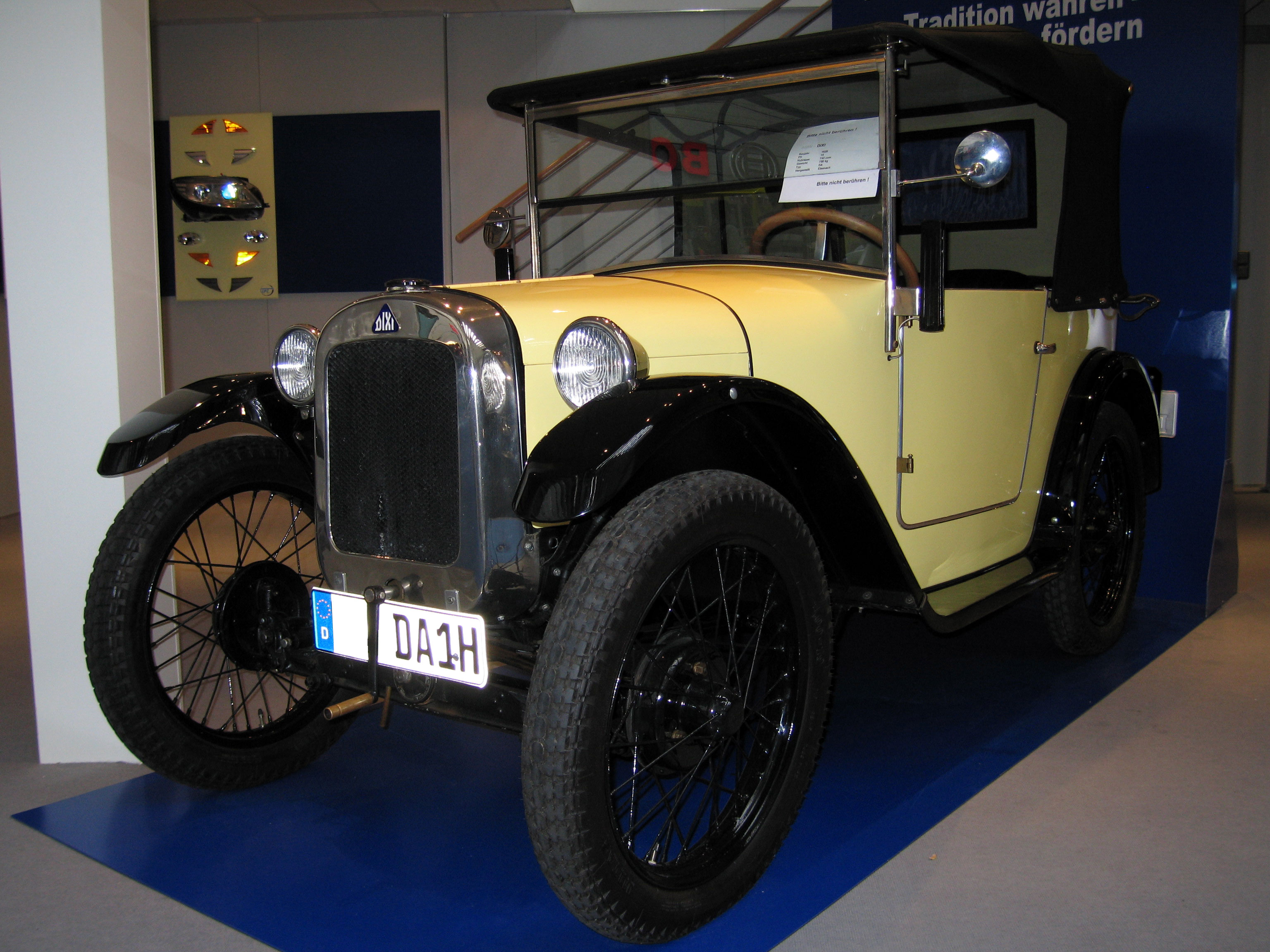

Overview
- Manufacturer: Bayerische Motoren Werke AG (BMW)
- Production: 1928–1931

Body and chassis
- Layout: FR layout
- Related: Austin 7

Powertrain
- Engine: 747 cc straight-4

Chronology
- Successor: BMW 3/15

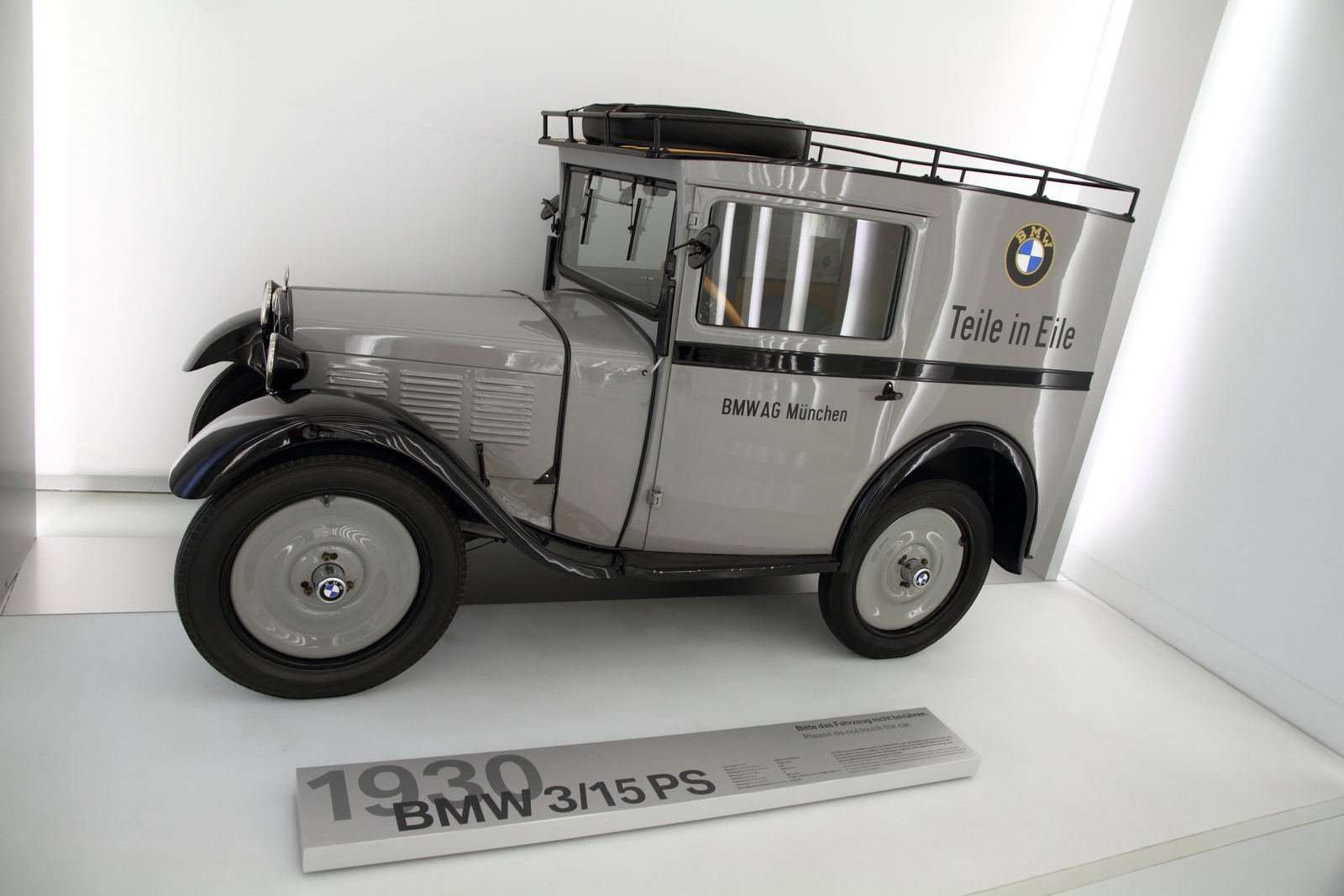
BMW model 3/15PS (BMW Dixi) from 1930

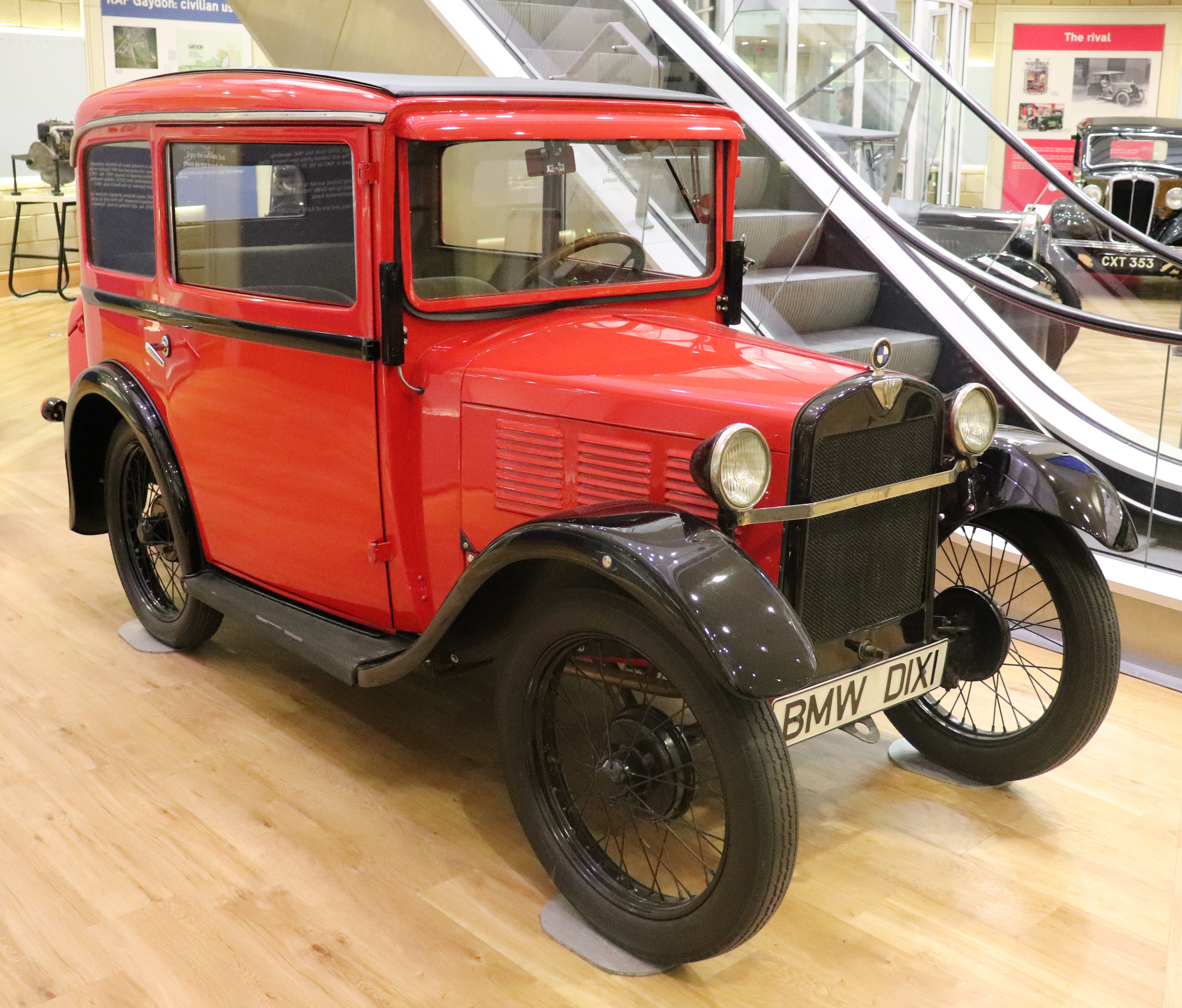
1928 BMW Dixi

Dixi was a car marque used by the Eisenach-based manufacturer Fahrzeugfabrik Eisenach (later Automobilwerk Eisenach) and, after BMW acquired the Eisenach plant in 1928, it was applied to the company’s licensed small car derived from the Austin Seven. The Austin-based Dixi 3/15 PS was produced at Eisenach under licence, and from July 1929 it was marketed as the BMW 3/15 PS (DA 2), after which the "Dixi" name was phased out in BMW badging.

The first 100 cars were supplied by Austin as kits, but by December 1927 the first of the official Dixi-manufactured vehicles, the DA-1 3/15PS were coming off the production line. The DA designation stood for Deutsche Ausführung, meaning German Version; 3/15 indicated the taxation and actual horsepower ratings. Apart from being left-hand drive and using metric fasteners, the car was nearly identical to the Austin. Body styles available were coupé, roadster, tourer, and sedan with a few chassis going to external coachbuilders. Most cars left the factory as tourers.

Looking to move into automobile manufacturing, BMW bought the Automobilwerk Eisenach in 1928 and, with it, the rights to build the Dixi car. At first the cars were badged as BMW Dixi but the Dixi name was dropped in 1929 when the DA-1 was replaced by a slightly updated version, the BMW 3/15 DA-2.

- Dixi DA 1 4 cyl, 15 hp (11 kW), 1927–1929
