= Bill Conoulty =

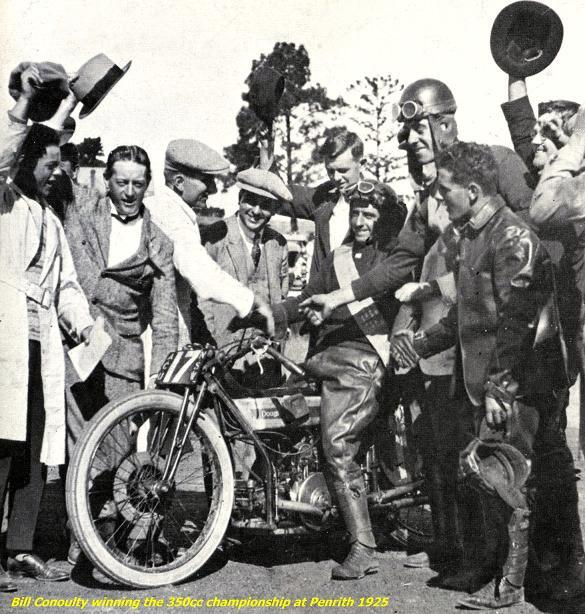
Bill Conoulty winning the 350cc championship at Penrith Speedway, 1925.

Thomas William "Bill" Conoulty (1899 or 1901 – 1961) is an Australian automotive engineer, automobile manufacturer and automobile racer, who was active in the 1920s, 1930s and 1940s and who is lauded for his improved, high performance, sports designs of the, also, legendary, Austin 7. His technically remarkable high performance versions of the Austin 7 included the astounding "Musso" or, as the Australian racing public preferred to refer to it, the Conoulty Special Austin Comet. Bill won numerous New South Wales, Australia Light Car Club Meets with this automobile, including a 1934 fastest time in Mountain Trials. Conoulty’s Sydney, Australia built Comet 65 roadster is also noteworthy.

Conoulty did not turn to automobiles, though, until 1927 and to competition automobile racing until 1929. Prior, thereto, he was, instead, famed as a motorcyclist and motorcycle racer. He set many Australian speed records on his 500 cc Douglas (motorcycles). In early 1923, Bill became the first person in New South Wales to attain a speed of 100 mph on a motorcycle. In 1925, he set a grass track record in Deagon, Queensland of 101.6 mph that stood for 18 years. In front of some 5000 spell bound spectators at Maroubra Speedway, he set a track record of 92.6 mph during a neck and neck race of 2 Australian leaders of an international assemblage of racers.

One of Conoulty’s novel and peculiar inventions was a tractor, powered by a gasoline fueled internal combustion engine, but, that could be used indoors without hazarding the carbon monoxide poisoning of a building’s inhabitants. Such a tractor was used in the late 1930s to haul a trolley of heavy soiled linen carts at the Royal Prince Alfred Hospital in Sydney, Australia. He also devised one of the earliest "Globe of death", where a modified Austin 7 and a Douglas motorcycle traveled in opposite directions.
