= Arthur Terdich =

Australian racing driver

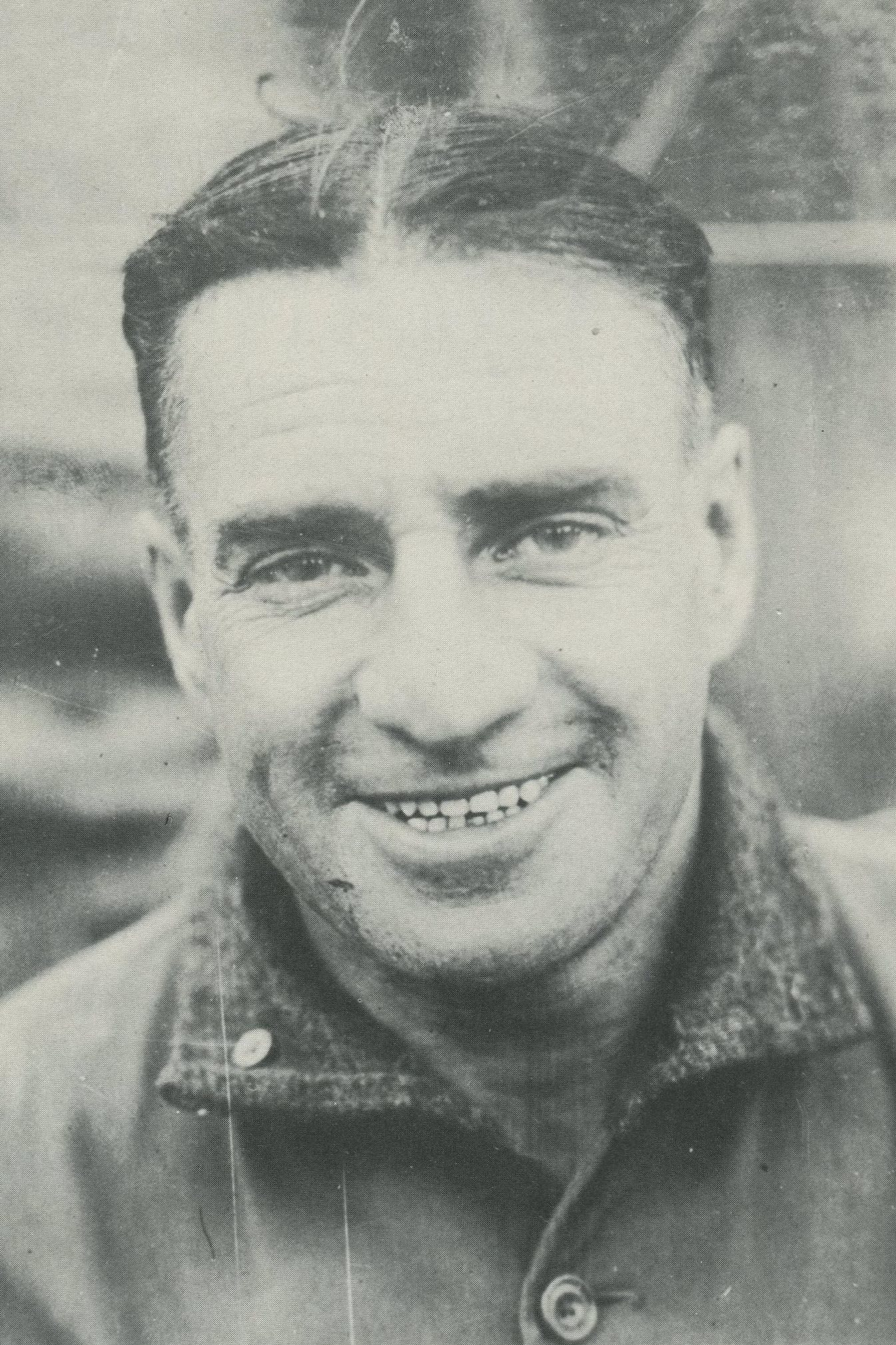
Arthur Terdich

Arthur Joseph Terdich (1890 - 9 March 1977) was an Australian racing driver. He won the 1929 Australian Grand Prix driving a supercharged Bugatti Type 37A.

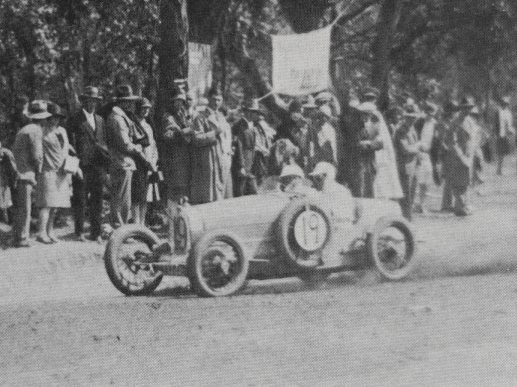
Terdich driving a Bugatti Type 37A to victory in the 1929 Australian Grand Prix

Sporting positions
Preceded by Arthur Waite	Winner of the Australian Grand Prix; 1929	Succeeded by Bill Thompson
