= Arthur Waite (racing driver) =

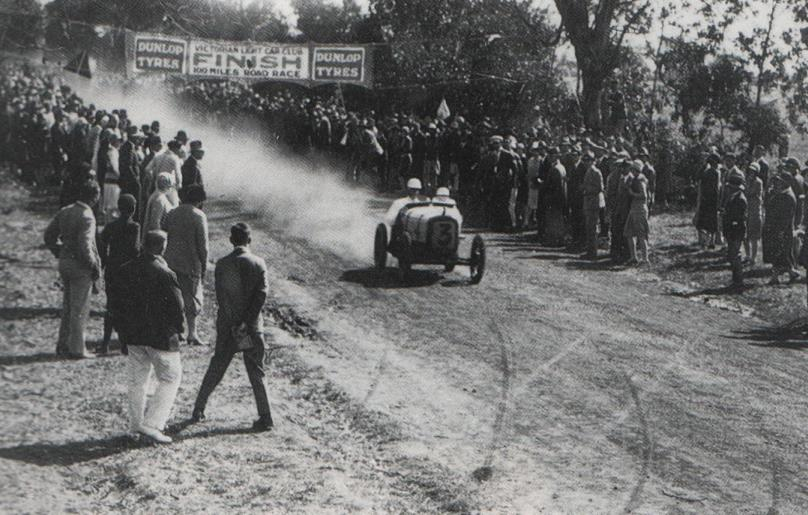
- Waite won the 1928 100 Miles Road Race (later known as the 1928 Australian Grand Prix) driving an Austin 7
- Born: Arthur Cyril Roy Waite; 9 April 1894 Adelaide, South Australia
- Died: 26 January 1991 (aged 96)
- Retired: Kingswood, Surrey, United Kingdom
- Relatives: Herbert Austin (father-in-law)

Australian Grand Prix
- Years active: 1928
- Teams: A Waite
- Best finish: 1st in 1928 Australian Grand Prix

Championship titles
- 1928: Australian Grand Prix

Colonel Arthur Cyril Roy Waite MC., OSt.J., DL., JP., (1894–1991) was an Australian racing driver.

Born in Adelaide, a son of William Nicholas Waite and Annie Waite, née Weston, Waite was employed with the engineering firm of Southcott Limited. He served at Gallipoli and was later hospitalised where he met his future wife, Irene Austin, the eldest daughter of Herbert Austin. After World War I Colonel Waite joined his father-in-law's firm, the Austin Motor Company. While in the employ of Austin, Waite was sent back to Australia, where in Melbourne he established Austin Distributors. Prior to leaving for Australia he had established the firm's motor racing efforts, winning races himself at Brooklands and Monza.

While in Australia he sent for his Austin 7 racing car in order to compete in the 100 Miles Road Race, later to become known as the 1928 Australian Grand Prix. A different car was sent however, but despite it being a relatively standard sports model it was a supercharged for racing version of the Austin 7. Despite this, Waite won the Grand Prix (held at Phillip Island).

Preceded by inaugural	Winner of the Australian Grand Prix; 1928	Succeeded by Arthur Terdich
