= Austin 7 =

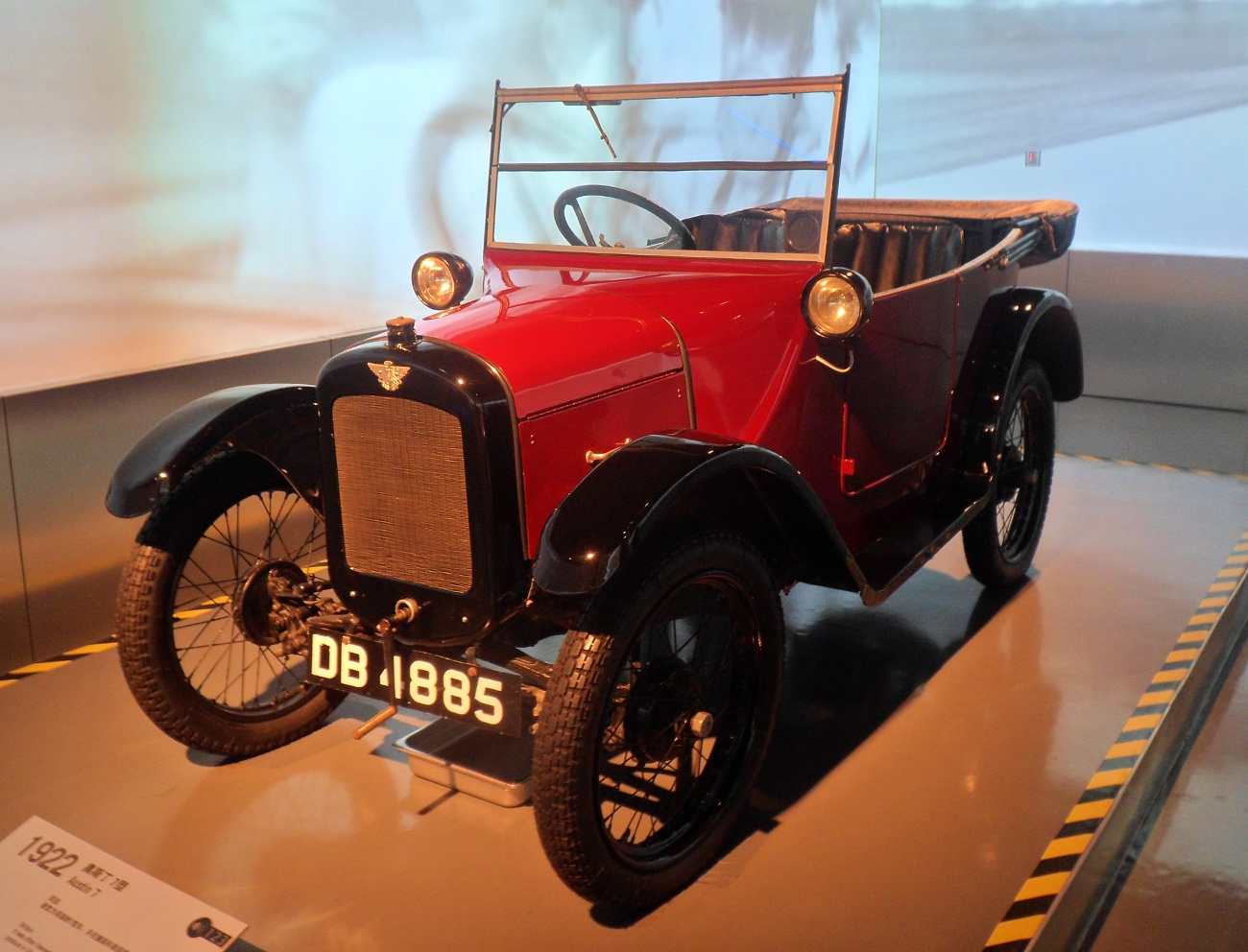
- Austin Seven for the first years of production

Overview
- Manufacturer: Austin
- Production: 1922–1939; 290,000 produced
- Assembly: United Kingdom: Longbridge (Longbridge plant); Australia: Melbourne; Sydney

Body and chassis
- Class: Economy car
- Body style: 2-door tourer; 2-door saloon; 2-door cabriolet; 2-door coupé; 3-door van

Powertrain
- Engine: 747 cc I4
- Transmission: 3-speed manual; 4-speed manual

Dimensions
- Wheelbase: 75 inches (1.9 m)
- Length: 110 in (2,800 mm)
- Width: 46 in (1,200 mm)
- Curb weight: 375 kg

Chronology
- Successor: Austin 8; Austin Big 7

The Austin 7 is an economy car that was produced from 1922 until 1939 in the United Kingdom by Austin. It was nicknamed the "Baby Austin" and was at that time one of the most popular cars produced for the British market and sold well abroad. Its effect on the British market was similar to that of the Model T Ford in the US, replacing most other British economy cars and cyclecars of the early 1920s. It was also licensed and copied by companies all over the world. The first BMW car, the BMW Dixi, was a licensed Austin 7. In France they were made and sold as Rosengarts, and in the United States they were built by the American Austin Car Company. In Japan, Nissan also used the 7 design as the basis for their first cars, although not under licence. This eventually led to a 1952 agreement for Nissan to build and sell Austins (which were now being made under the British Motor Corporation) in Japan under the Austin name.

Many Austin 7s were rebuilt as "specials" after the Second World War, including the first race car built by Bruce McLaren, and the first Lotus, the Mark I. Companies such as Speedex in Luton thrived in the late 1950s by producing race-proven bodies and engine parts for the Seven chassis.

Such was the power of the Austin 7 name that the company re-used it for early versions of the A30 in 1951 and Mini in 1959.

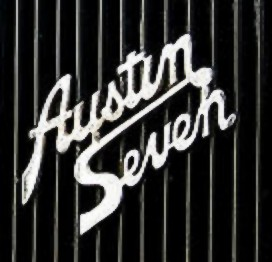

== History ==
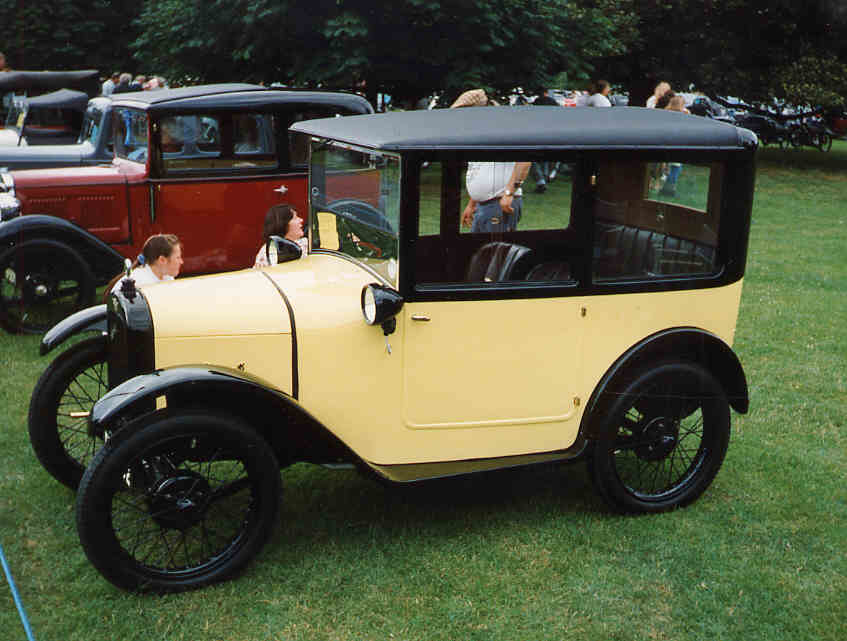
Austin 7 saloon 1926

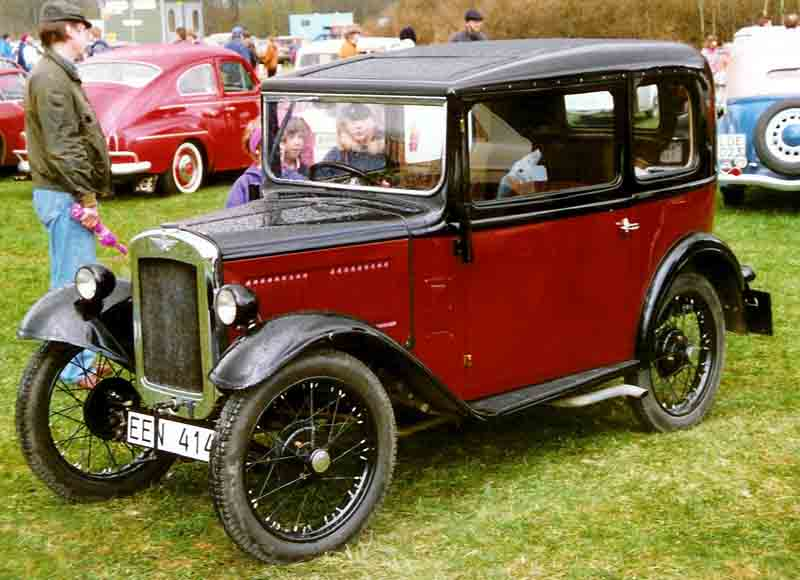
Austin 7 Saloon 1931

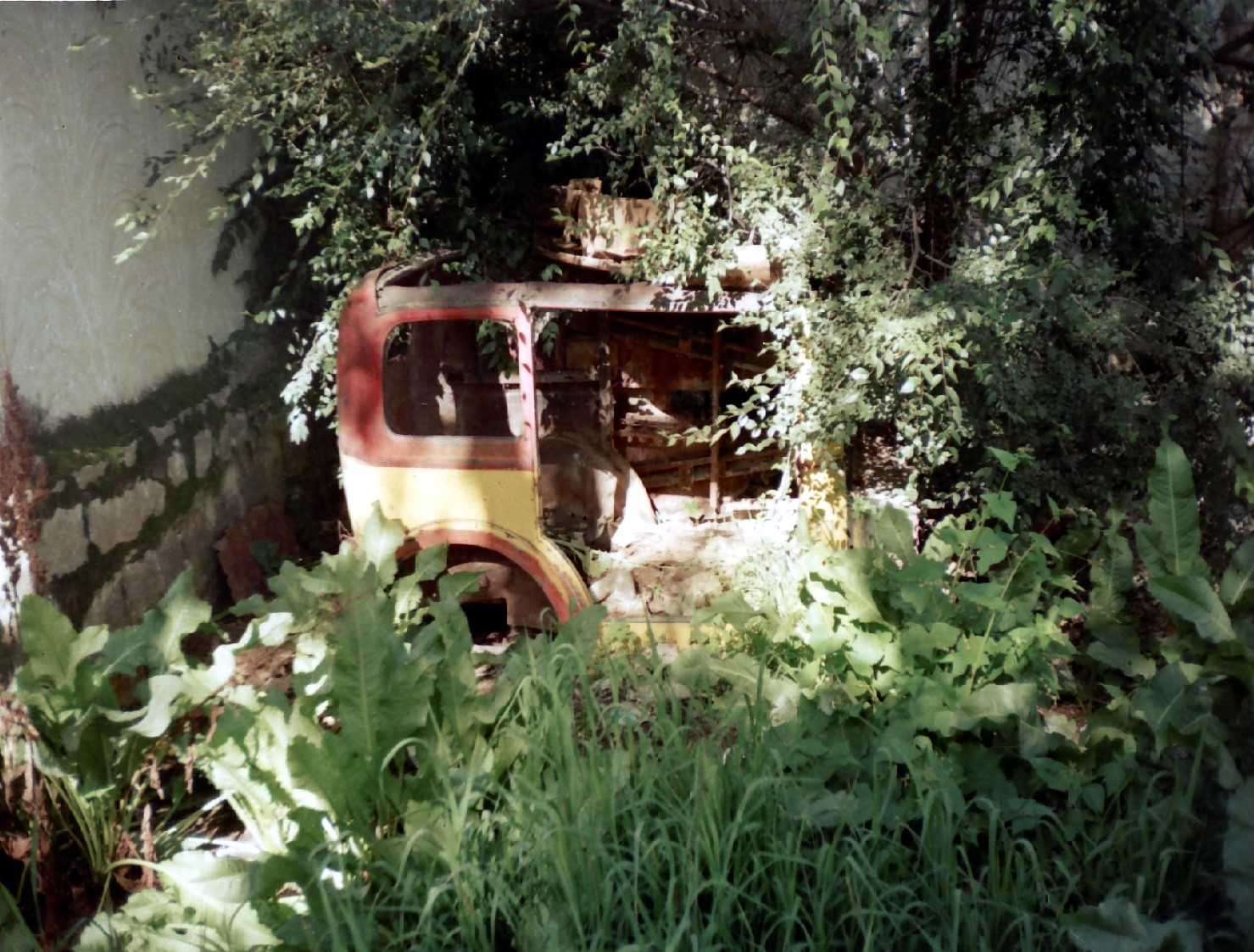
Remains of Dalai Lama's Austin 7 in Lhasa, 1993

Until the First World War, Austin built mainly large cars, but in 1909 they sold a single-cylinder small car built by Swift of Coventry called the Austin 7 hp. After this they returned to bigger cars.

In 1920 Sir Herbert Austin commenced working on the concept of a smaller car, mainly to meet the needs of young families aspiring to own an affordable motor car. This idea was spurred on by the introduction of the Horsepower Tax in 1921. His design concept marked a departure from his company's conservative motoring past and Austin received considerable opposition from his board of directors and creditors. Because the company was in receivership, Austin decided to carry out the project himself, and in 1921 hired an 18-year-old draughtsman, Stanley Edge, from the Austin factory at Longbridge, Birmingham to aid in the drawing of detailed plans. This work was carried out in the billiard room of Austin's Lickey Grange home.

Edge later claimed to have convinced Austin to use a small four-cylinder engine. The original side valve engine design featured a capacity of 696cc (55mm x 77mm) giving a RAC rating of 7.2 hp. The cast cylinder block featured a detachable head and was mounted on an aluminium crankcase. The crankshaft used one roller and two ball bearings and the big-ends were splash lubricated. Edge also later claimed to have carried out the design of other mechanical components such as the three speed gearbox and clutch assembly. Austin was largely responsible for styling the Seven's design, which was reportedly influenced by the design of the Peugeot Quadrilette. The "A" frame chassis design was believed to have been influenced by the design of an American truck used in the Longbridge factory in the early 1920s.

The design was completed in 1922 and three prototypes were constructed in a special area of the Longbridge factory, and announced to the public in July 1922. Austin had put a large amount of his own money into the design and patented many of its innovations in his own name. In return for his investment he was paid a royalty of two guineas (£2, 2s), (£2.10) on every car sold.

Nearly 2,500 cars were made in the first year of production (1923), not as many as hoped, but within a few years the "big car in miniature" had wiped out the cyclecar industry and transformed the fortunes of the Austin Motor Co. By 1939 when production finally ended, 290,000 cars and vans had been made.

== Chassis ==
The Austin 7 was considerably smaller, at 3/4 size, than the Ford Model T. The wheelbase was only 75 in (1.91 m), and the track only 40 inches (1.02 m). Equally, it was lighter – less than half the Ford's weight at 794 pounds (360 kg). The engine required was thus also modest – the small 747 cc sidevalve with an actual 10 hp output gave adequate performance.

The chassis took the form of an "A" with the engine mounted between the channel sections at the narrow front end. The rear suspension was by quarter elliptic leaf springs, cantilevered from the rear of the chassis, while at the front a beam axle had a centrally mounted transverse semi-elliptic leaf spring.

Steering is by worm and wheel mechanism.

The Austin 7 had brakes on all four wheels from the start, but initially the footbrake only operated the rear wheel brakes, while the front brakes worked via the handbrake. From 1930, the Austin's front and rear brakes became fully coupled.

In late 1931 the chassis was lengthened by 6" with a corresponding increase in the rear track.

== Engine and transmission ==
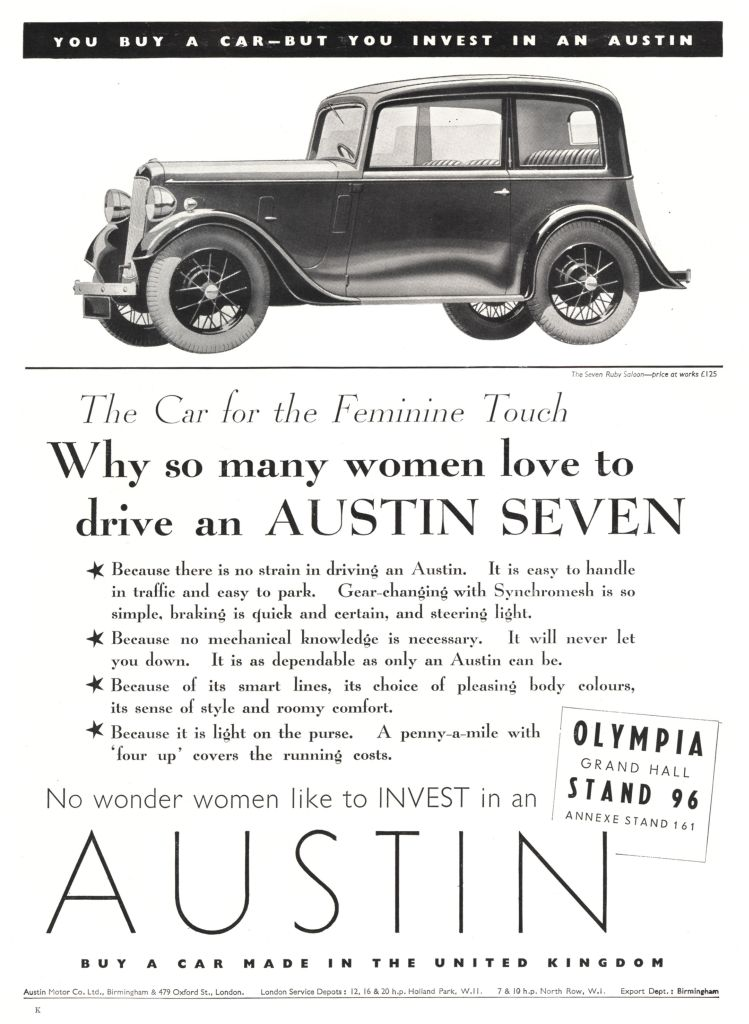
1937 advertisement

The original 1922 four-cylinder Austin Seven engine had a bore of 2.125 in (54.0 mm) and stroke of 3 in (76 mm), giving a capacity of 696 cc and RAC rating of 7.2 hp. From March 1923 the bore was increased to 2.2 in (56 mm) giving 747 cc and 10.5 hp. The side-valve engine was composed of an aluminium crankcase, cast iron cylinder block and cast iron cylinder head. Cooling was by thermosiphon, without a water pump, and the dynamo was driven from the timing gears.

The big end bearings were lubricated by jets from an oil gallery in the crankcase, the oil striking the crankshaft webs which were drilled accordingly. Originally the journal diameter was 1.125"; this was later increased to 1.3125". The three bearing engine (from 1936) used a white metal centre bearing.

The splash-lubricated crankshaft (pressure fed on some sports models) at first ran in two bearings (two ball bearings at the front, roller at the back) changing to three in 1936. An electric starter was fitted from November 1923. The early cars used magneto ignition, but this was changed to coil in 1928.

The 3-speed and reverse gearbox was bolted to the back of the engine and had a variety of ratios depending on the application: touring, sports, racing and trials. A four-speed gearbox was introduced in 1932 and in 1933 synchromesh was added to third and top ratios extending to second gear in 1934.

The back axle was of spiral bevel type with ratios between 4.4:1 and 5.6:1 with 4.9:1 being the most common until the 1930s. A short torque tube ran forward from the differential housing to a bearing and bracket on the rear axle cross member.

Reliant used a derivative of the Austin Seven engine for their early three-wheelers, before developing a new aluminium alloy engine (used as the replacement for the Austin Seven engine by the 750 Motor Club in their Formula 750 motor sport) introduced in the 1962 Reliant Regal 3/25.

== Gordon England ==
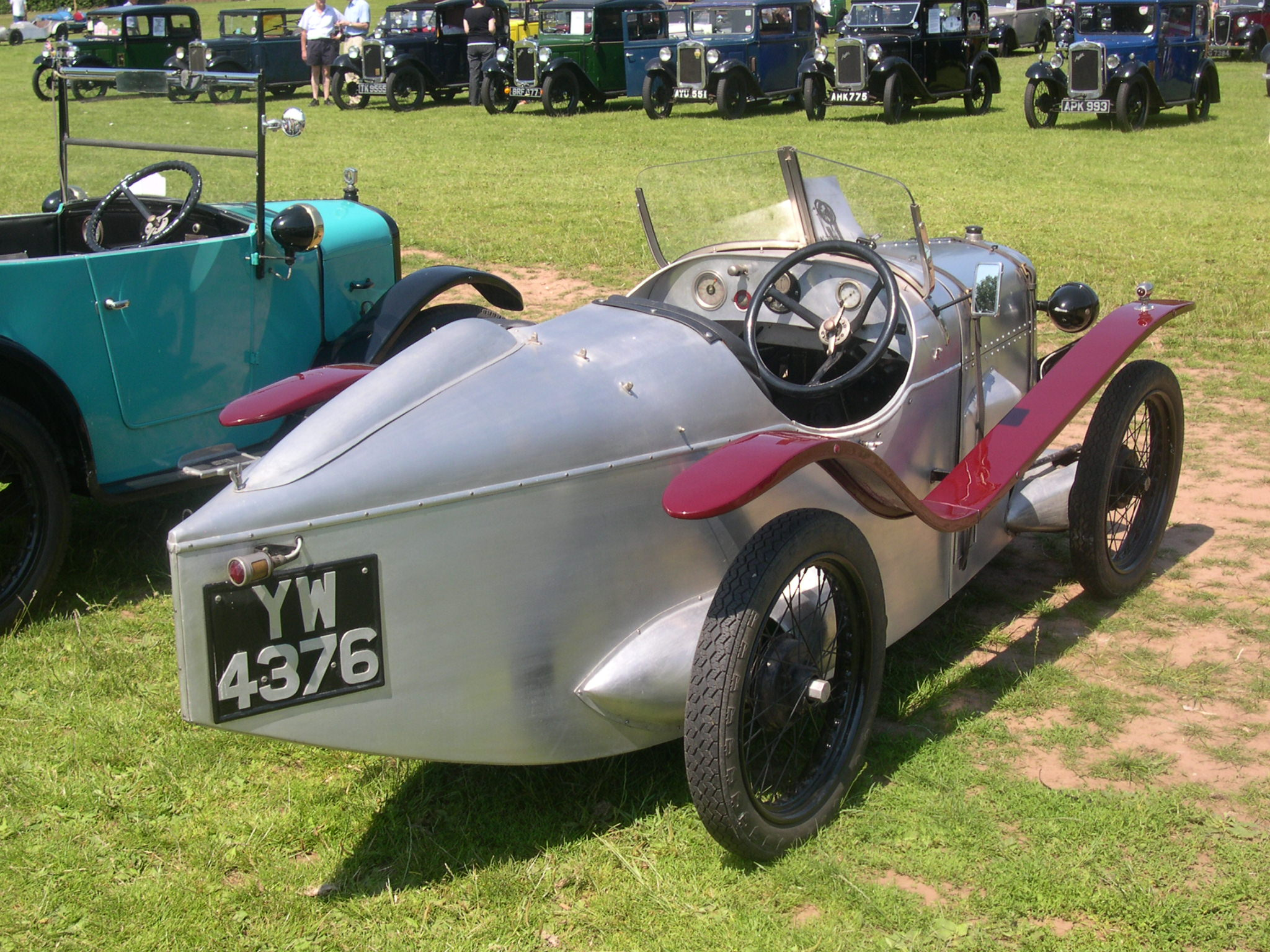
Gordon England Brooklands replica

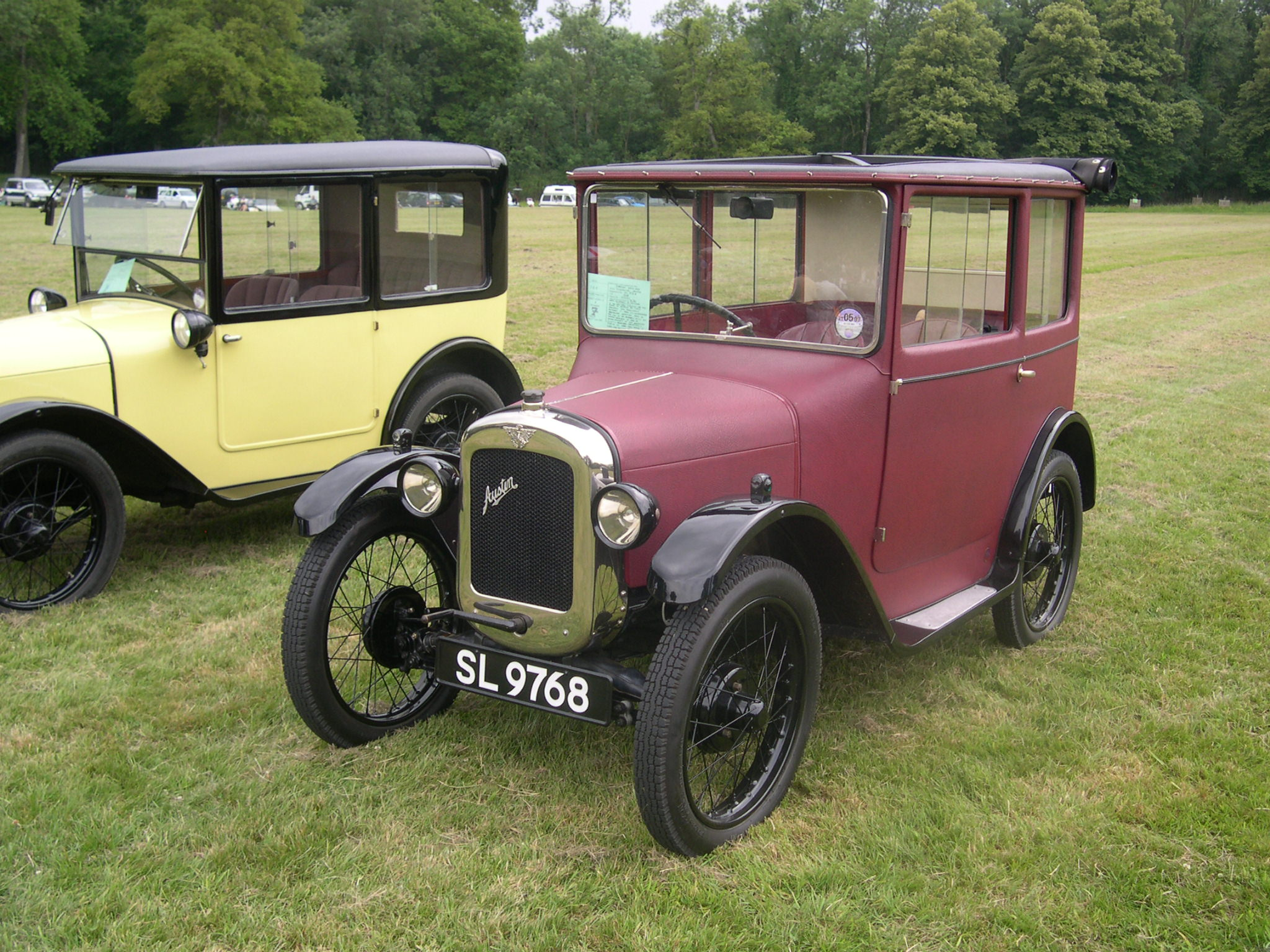
Gordon England Sunshine saloon number 263

Herbert Austin's son-in-law, Arthur Waite, soon began to achieve remarkable sporting successes beginning at Brooklands in March 1923 and the next month at Monza. Another driver, E C Gordon England, persuaded Sir Herbert to provide him with a racing 7. Waite and Lou Kings (chief tester) then experienced a run of failure brought about by inadequate engine lubrication for racing conditions. Meanwhile, Gordon England, flushed with success from establishing six new class records at Brooklands, had built a special lightweight 2-seater body weighing just 20 lb (9.1 kg) and entered it in the 1100 cc class for the Junior Car Club 200 mile race at Brooklands in October 1923. There England finished in second place and during the race won another five class records.

As a result, two new sports models were offered by Austin in January 1924, the Sports and the Brooklands Super-sports. The Brooklands Super-sports was a replica of England's record-breaker. Each car was sold with a Brooklands certificate proving a speed of 80 miles 0 chains (80.00 miles, 128.75 km) per hour. By 1925 Gordon England held nineteen 750 cc class records.

== Austin Seven saloon by Gordon England ==
The first Austin 7 saloon was made by England's coachbuilding company. England had been an aircraft designer with Bristol Gordon England biplanes. His fabric saloon body based on aircraft principles was said to be the smallest closed car in the world. Its body weighed 28 lb (13 kg) less than the tourer and at £210, almost double the £112 chassis price. It showed there would be a market for an Austin-made steel-panelled saloon which was introduced in September 1926 at £165 (equivalent to £8720 in 2025).

Until fabric bodies fell from fashion in the early 1930s the Gordon England Fabric "de luxe" Saloon remained in Austin's catalogue at a £20 (14%) premium over Austin's standard steel saloon. It was accompanied by their 2-seater Gordon England Cup Model.

== Austin Seven Swallow ==
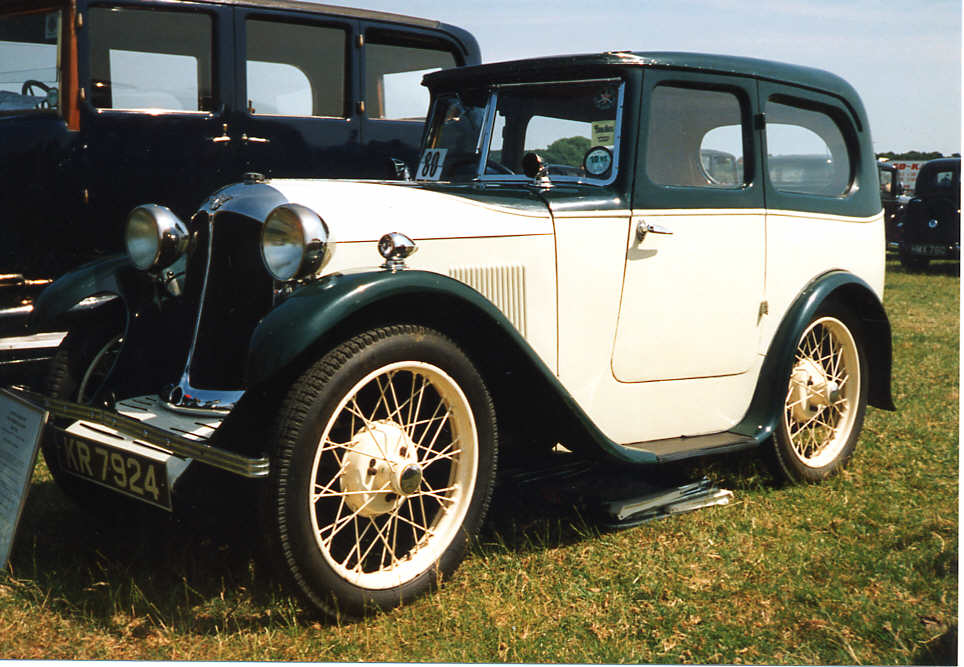
1931 Austin Seven Swallow saloon

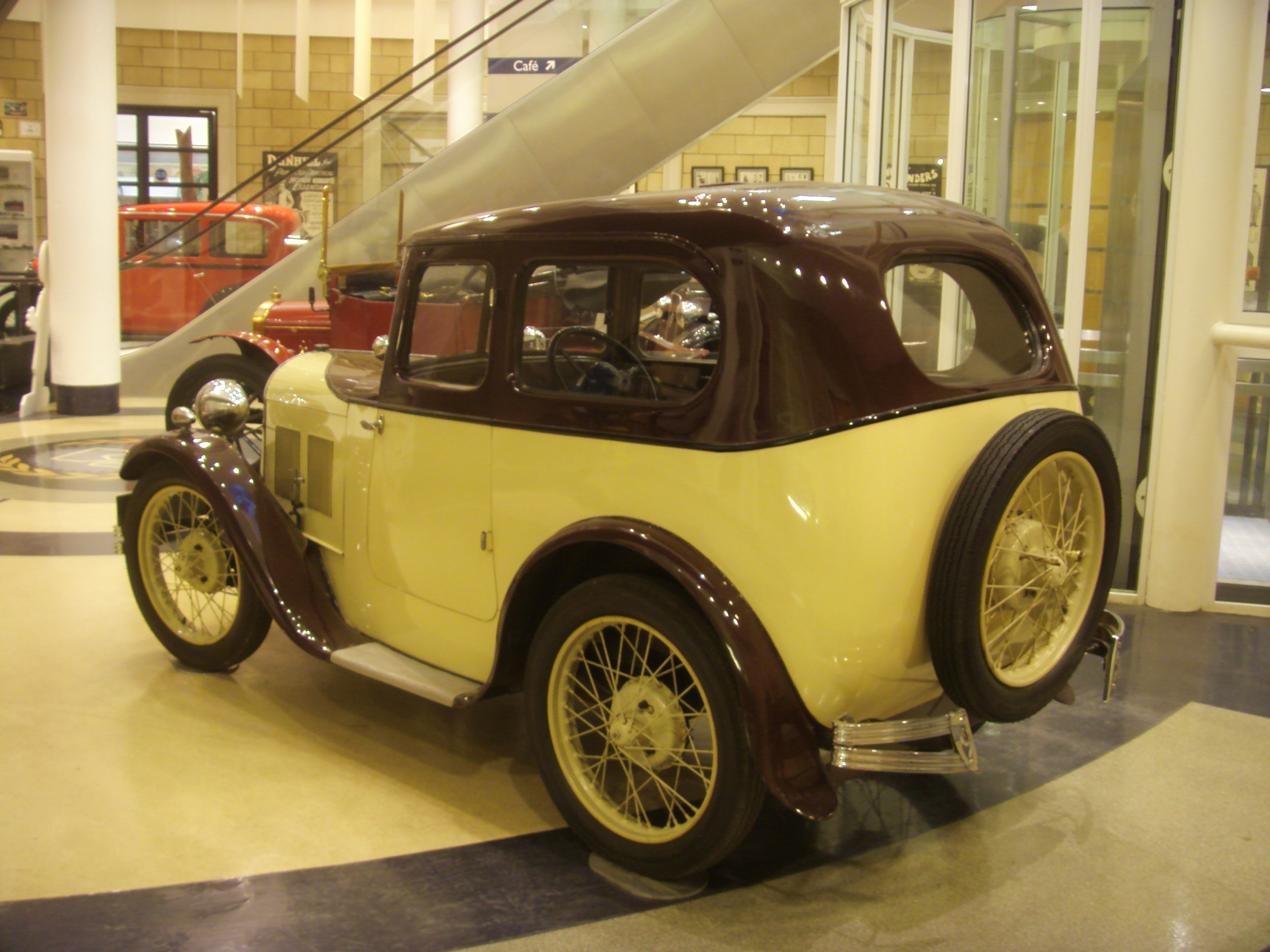
1931 Austin 7 Swallow, rear quarter

In 1927, William Lyons, co-founder of the Swallow Sidecar Company saw commercial potential in producing a re-bodied Austin 7. Buying a chassis from dealer Parkers of Bolton Lyons commissioned Swallow's talented employee, coachbuilder Cyril Holland, to produce a distinctive open tourer: the Austin Seven Swallow. Holland (1895-1983), who joined Swallow in late 1926, had served his apprenticeship with Lanchester and would become chief body engineer. The height of saloon car fashion of the day was to have the back of the body fully rounded, this was called "dome" shaped.

With its bright two-tone colour scheme and a style befitting more expensive cars of the time, together with its low cost (£175), the Swallow proved popular and was followed in 1928 by a saloon version: the Austin Seven Swallow Saloon.

Approximately 3,500 bodies of various styles were produced up until 1932, when Lyons started making complete cars under the SS cars marque.

Such was the demand for the Austin Seven Swallows that Lyons was forced to move in 1928 from Blackpool to new premises in Coventry. It was, in part, the success of the Swallows that laid the foundations of what was to become, by 1945, Jaguar Cars.

== Licensed production ==
Versions of the Austin 7 were made under licence by American Austin from 1930, Dixi (later bought by BMW) in Germany from 1927 and Rosengart in France from 1928. Austin 7s were also manufactured by Nissan (Datsun) but reports differ as to whether these were built under licence or were unlicensed copies. In addition, rolling chassis were exported to Australia to have locally made bodies attached.

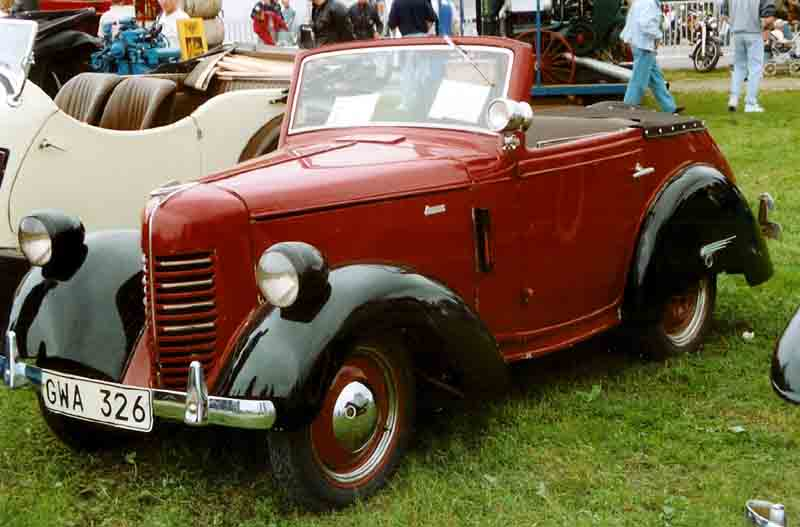
1939 American Bantam (U.S.)

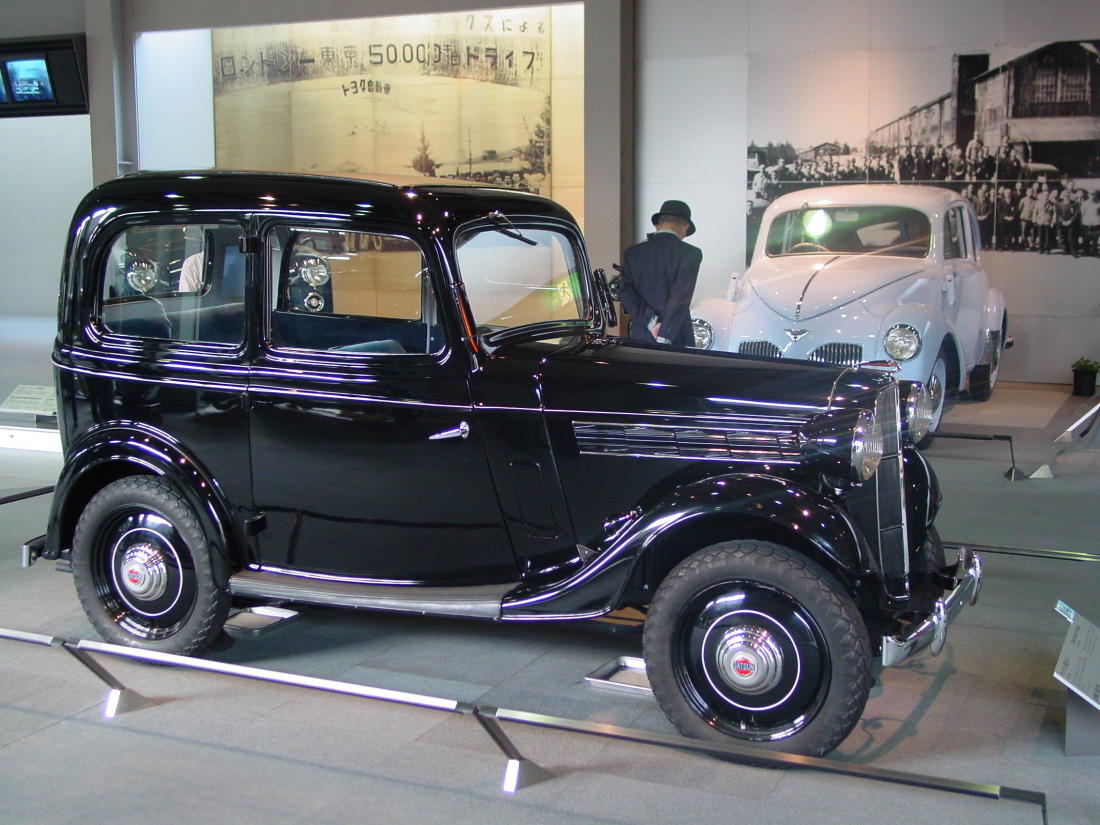
1937 Nissan (Datsun) 16 (Japan)

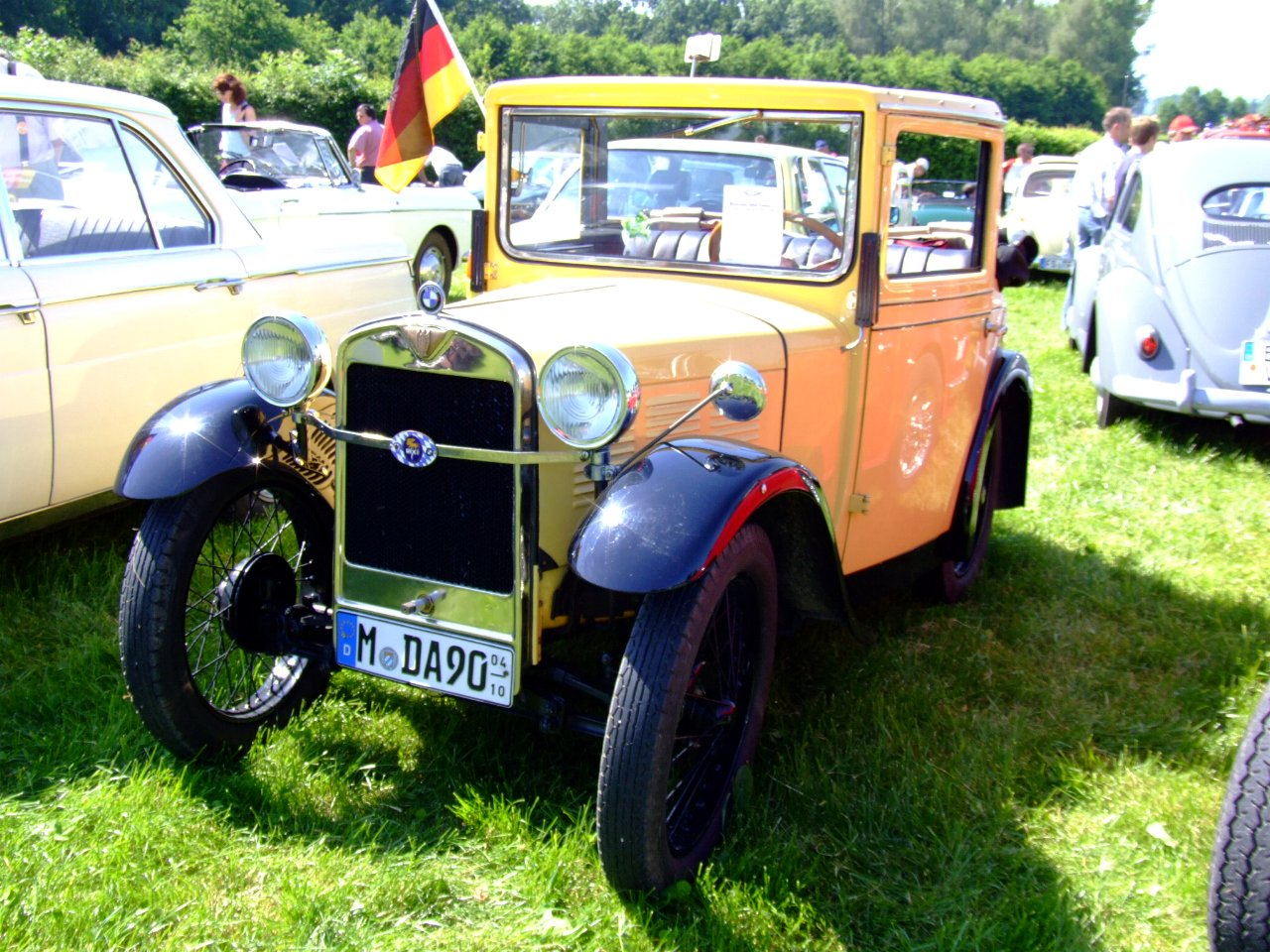
1930 BMW 3/15 (Germany)

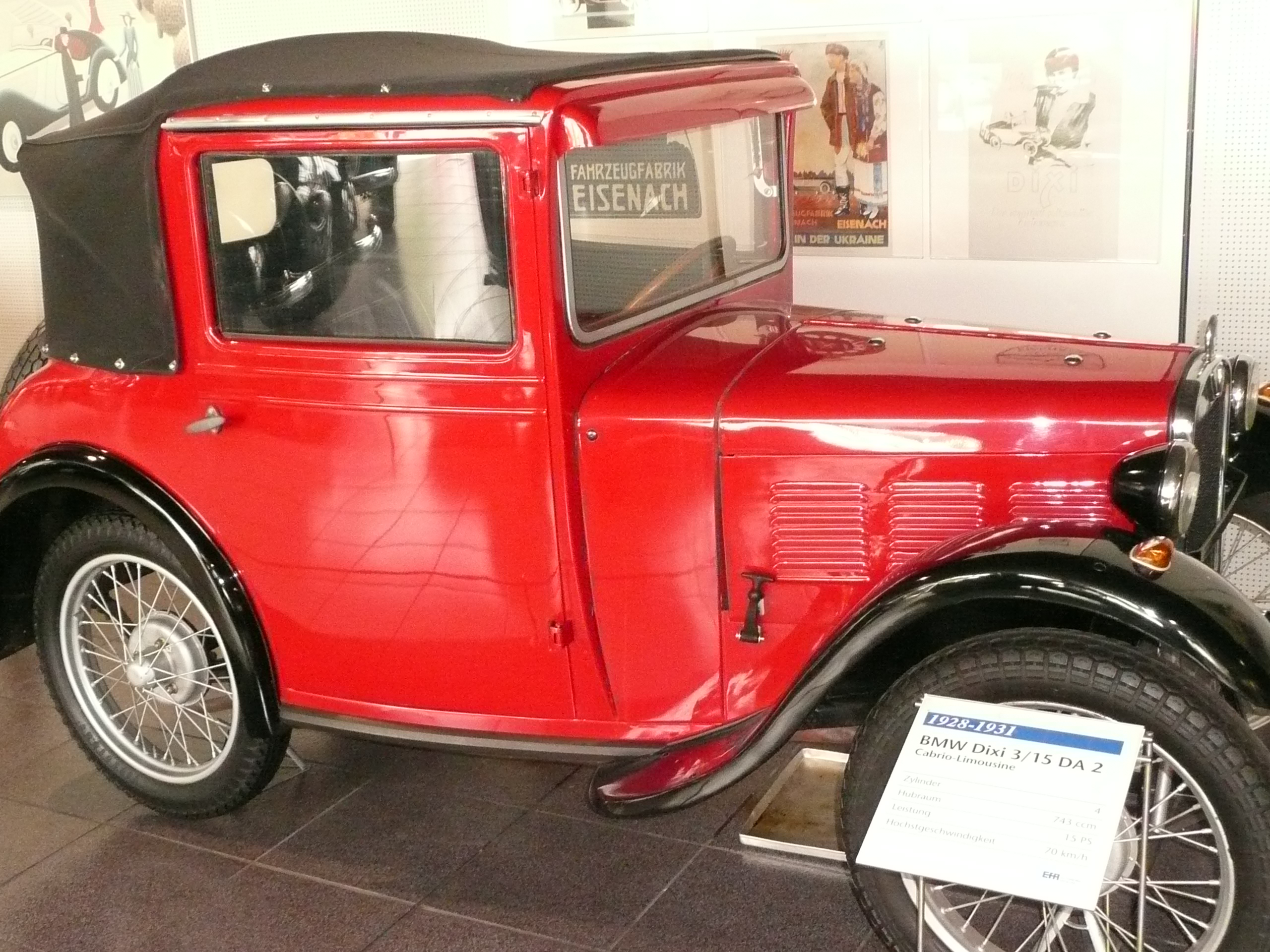
1930 BMW Dixi 3/15 (Germany)

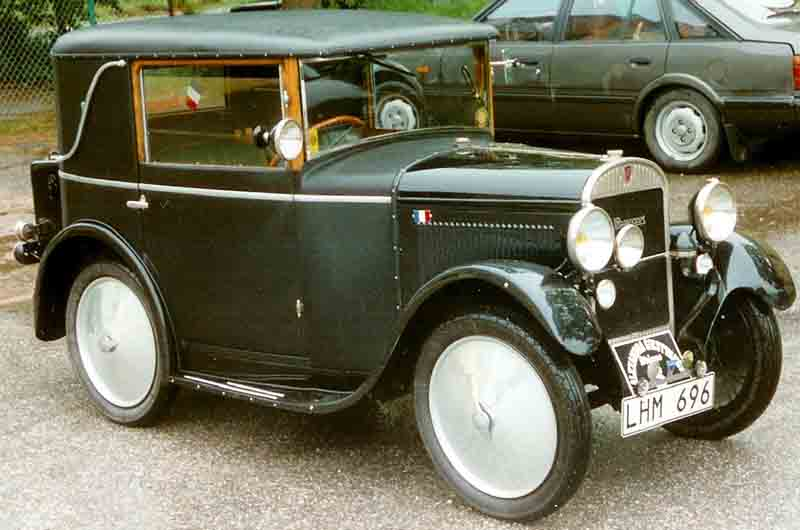
1928 Rosengart LR4 (France)

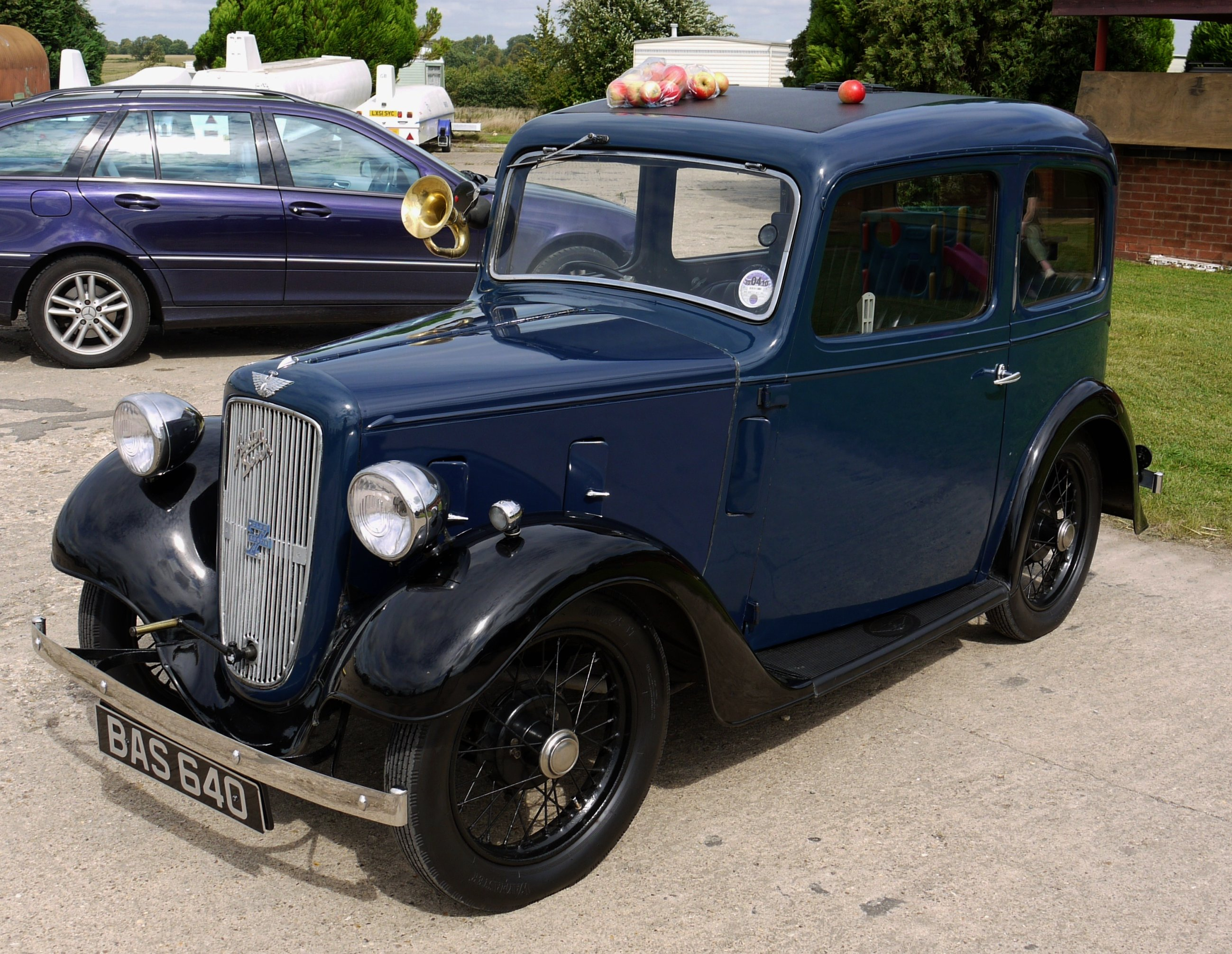
1936 Austin Seven

=== American Austin, American Bantam, and Jeep ===
The American Austin Car Company was founded in 1929, in Butler, Pennsylvania, in premises that had belonged to the Standard Steel Car Company. Their intention was to assemble and sell in the United States a version of the Austin 7 car, called American Austin. After some initial success the Great Depression set in, and sales fell off to the point that production was suspended. In 1934 the company filed for bankruptcy.

The automobile was designed in the hopes of creating a market for small-car enthusiasts in the United States. The cars had 747 cc (45.6 cu in) inline-four engines, enabling the car to return 40 mpg_{‑US} (48 mpg_{‑imp}; 5.9 L/100 km), and travel 1,000 miles or 1,600 kilometres per 2 US qt (1.7 imp qt; 1.9 L) fill of oil.

== Australian-bodied Austin Sevens ==
In the aftermath of World War I the Australian Government imposed a tariff on imported vehicles, with tax concessions applying to rolling chassis, as a stimulus to develop a sovereign motor vehicle industry. The chassis concession acted as a financial incentive for local coach-builders to import factory built rolling chassis, and fit uniquely Australian designed and built bodies, leading to the establishment of an Australian motor vehicle bodybuilding industry in the early 1920s.

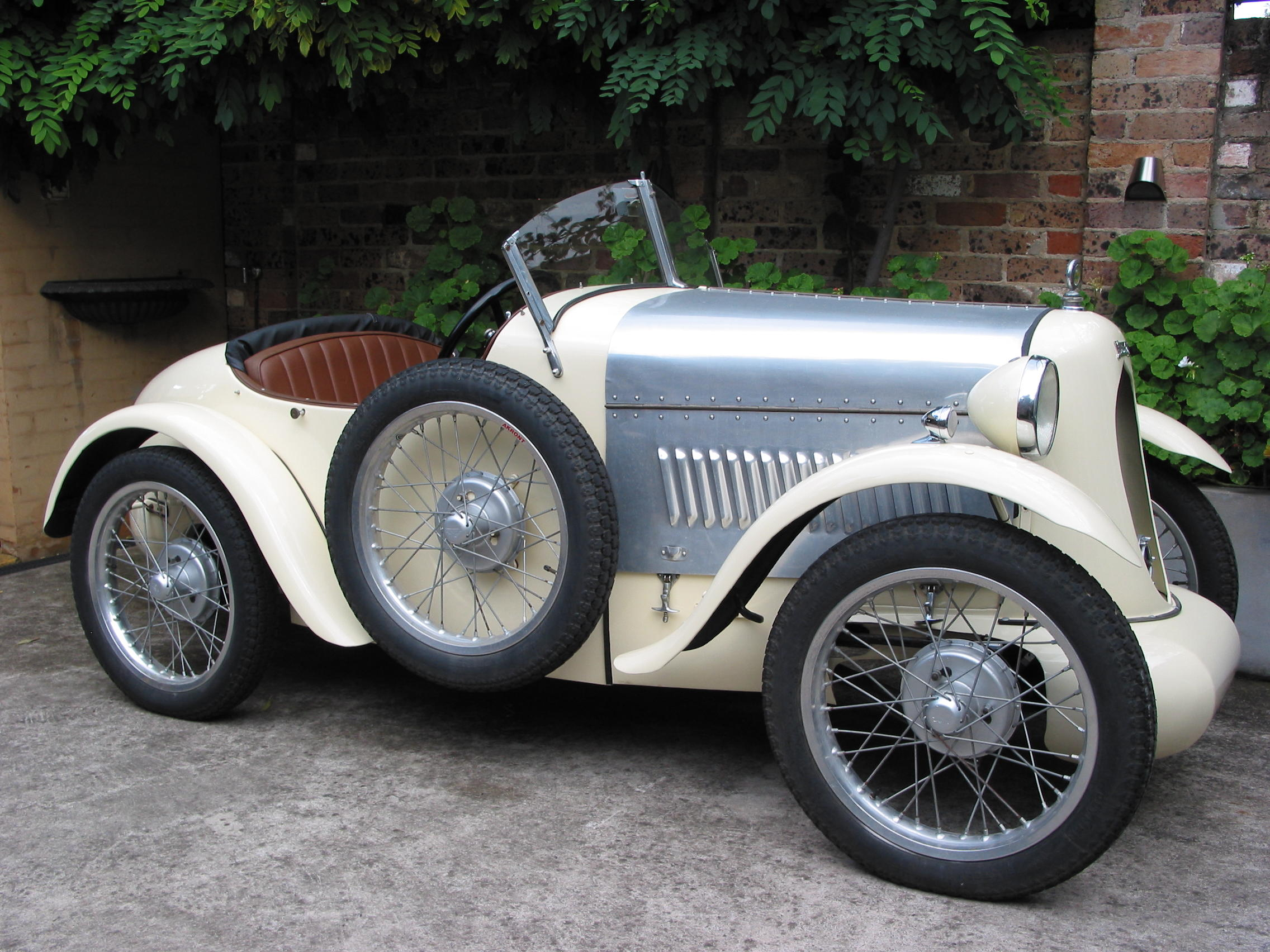
1929 Australian-bodied Austin 7 Meteor (Coach-builder A. Robinson & Co. Castlereagh St, Sydney)

The largest and best known of these Australian coach-builders was Holden's Motor Body Builders. Holden built Australian-bodied Austin Seven tourer and roadster models from the mid-1920s.

However, several smaller coach-builders built limited numbers of Australian-bodied Austin Seven sports models between 1924 and 1934. Some examples of these Australian-bodied sports models are; the Standard Sports, built by Flood Motor Body Works, St Kilda Road, Melbourne; the Wasp built by William Green, Parramatta Road, Petersham, Sydney; the Moth built by Geo Sykes, Gordon Road, Chatswood, Sydney; the Comet built by Bill Conoulty, Sydney; and the Meteor. The Meteor was built by several coach-builders (Flood Motor Body Works, St Kilda Road, Melbourne; Jack Lonzar, Kent Town Adelaide; and A Robinson & Co., 181 Castlereagh St, Sydney), with individual variations to the common design.

== Layout ==
In 2007, during an episode of Top Gear, Jeremy Clarkson and James May studied a number of early car designs (including the Ford Model T and the De Dion-Bouton Model Q) and concluded that the Austin Seven was the first mass-market car to be fitted with a "conventional" control layout, as found on modern cars (although the earliest car they found to use this layout was a Cadillac Type 53 in 1916).

== Body styles ==
=== Tourers ===
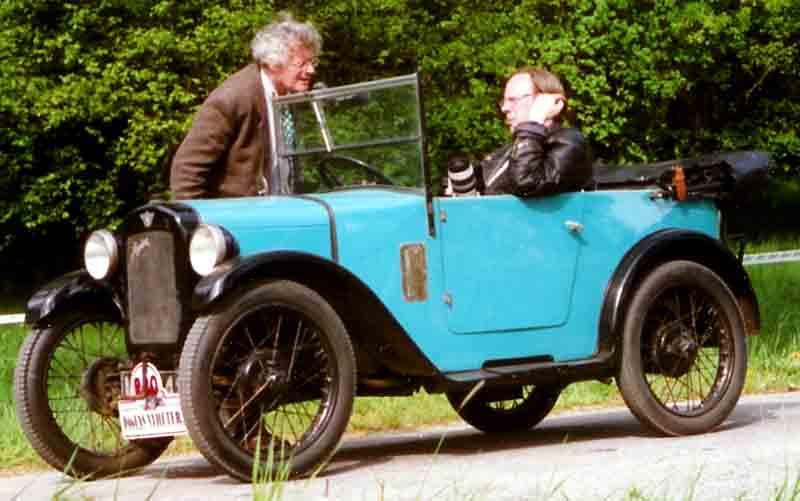
Austin 7 Chummy Tourer 1929

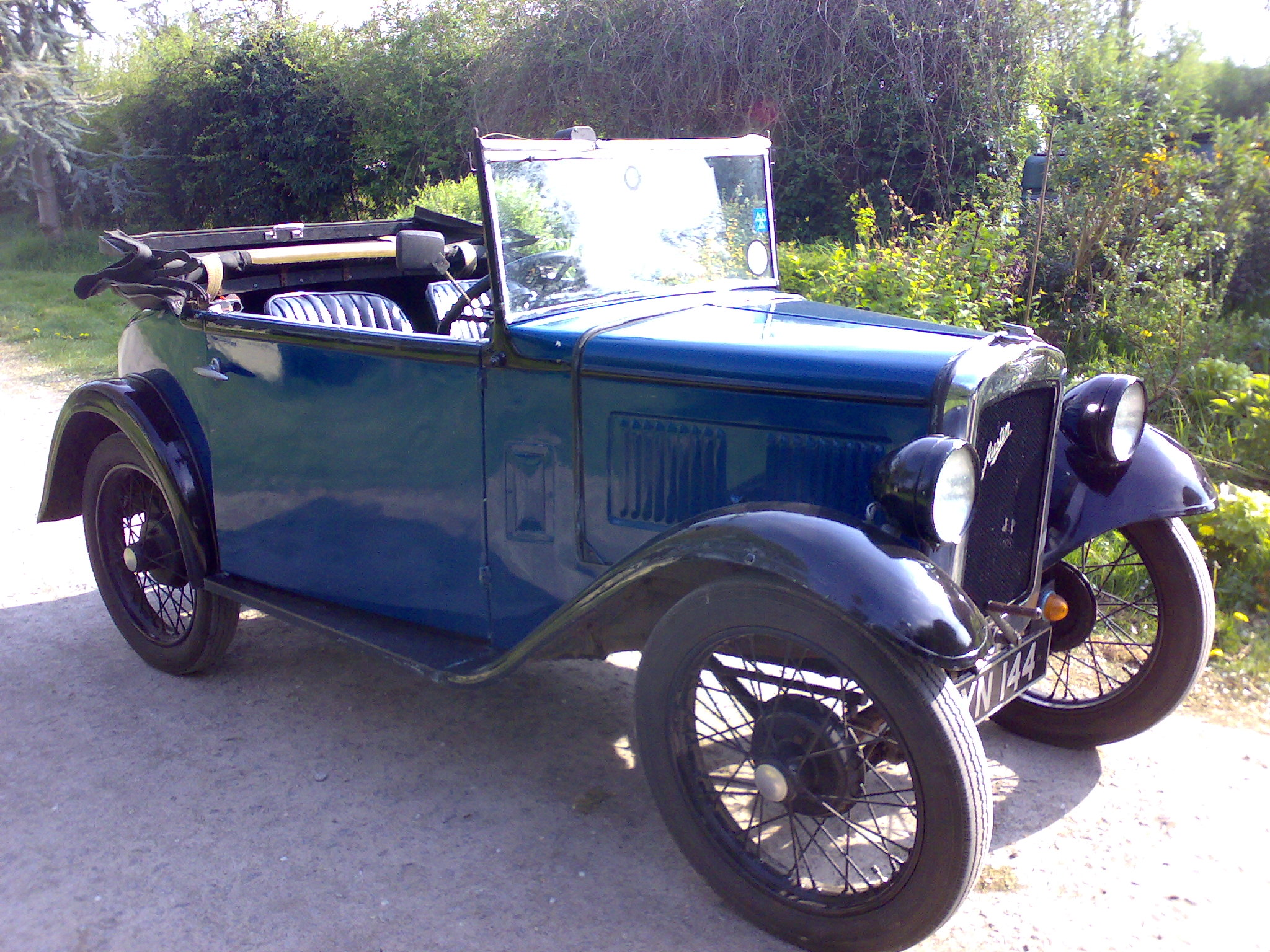
1934 Austin 7 PD Tourer (pre-Opal)

Type	Name	Description	From	To
XL		prototypes	1922	
AB		Aluminium-bodied four-seater	1922	1924
AC			1924	1926
AD		Four seater	1926	1929
AE		Four seater. Two inches wider than AD	1929	1929
		Two seater	1929	1930
AF		Steel-bodied four-seater	1930	1932
AH		Pressed-steel body. Four seater	1932	
AAK	Open road Tourer	Cowled radiator		1934
AH		Pressed-steel body. Four seater	1932	
PD		Two seater	1934	
APD	Opal	Two seater	1934	1936
AAL	Open Road Tourer	Covered spare wheel	1935	
AH		Pressed-steel body. Four seater	1932	
APE	New Opal	Two seater	1936	

=== Saloons ===
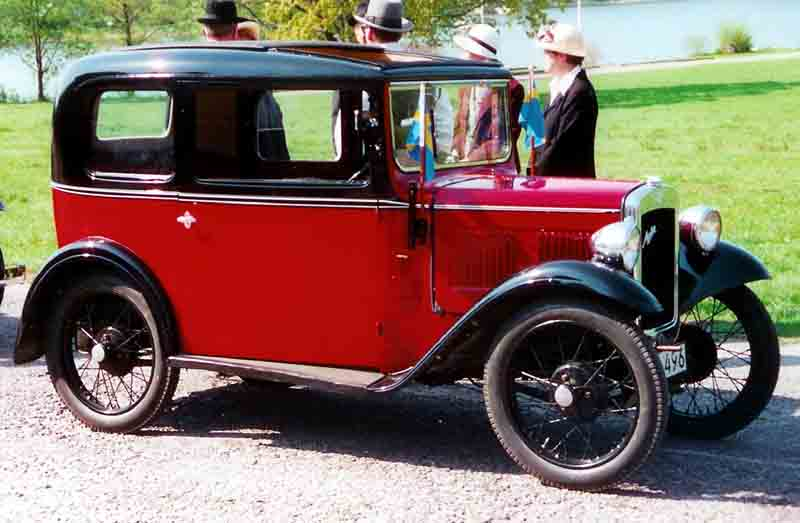
Austin 7 Box Saloon 1933

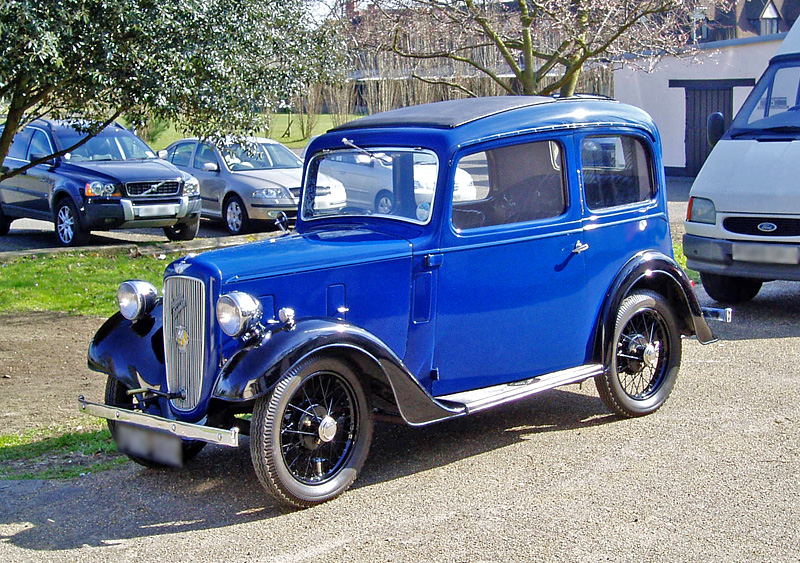
Austin 7 "New Ruby" saloon

Type	Name	Description	From	To
R		Aluminium or fabric saloon	1926	1927
RK		Aluminium or fabric saloon	1927	
RL		Steel saloon	1930	
RG		Fabric saloon	1930	
RN		Long-wheelbase steel saloon		
RP			1932	
ARQ	Ruby	Saloon	1934	
ARR	"New" Ruby	Saloon	1936	1939

=== Cabriolet ===
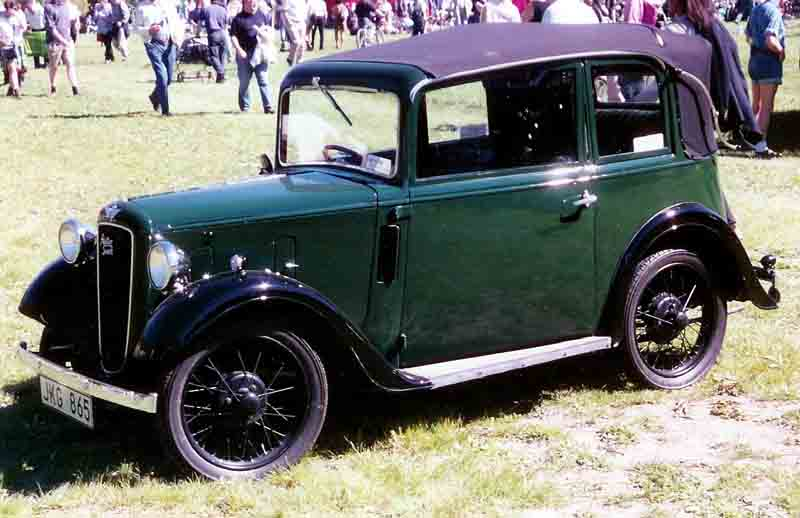
Austin 7 Pearl Cabriolet 1935

Type	Name	Description	From	To
AC	Pearl	Cabriolet version of ARQ Ruby.	1934	
ACA	"New" Pearl	Cabriolet version of ARR New Ruby.	1936	

=== Sports ===
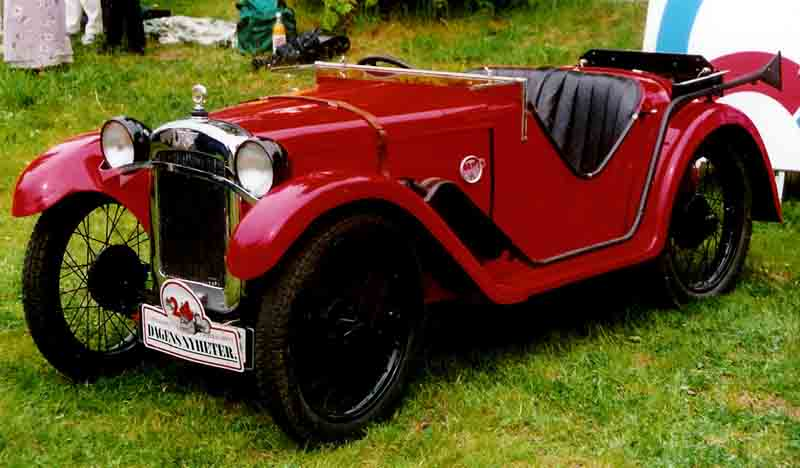
Austin 7 Ulster 2-Seater Sports 1930

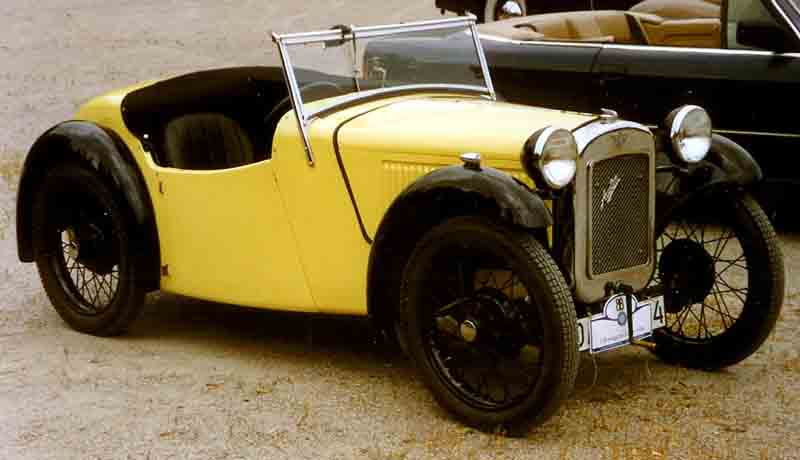
Austin 7 Nippy 2-Seater Sports 1934

Type	Name	Description	From	To
50 mph		Aluminium bodied. Long tail		1926
E Super Sports		Aluminium bodied. No doors	1927	1928
EA Sports	Ulster	Aluminium bodied. No doors		
EB 65	65	Aluminium body, steel wings. Rounded tail.	1933	1934
AEB	Nippy	All steel	1934	1937
EK 75	Speedy	Aluminium body. Pointed tail.		
AEK	Speedy	Redesignation of EK 75		1935

The Ulster gained its name from a strong performance in the 1929 RAC Tourist Trophy held at the Ards circuit in County Down, where Archie Frazer-Nash finished third and S. V. Holbrook finished fourth.

=== Coupés ===
Type	Name	Description	From	To
Type B		Upper body fabric.	1928	1931

=== Vans ===
Type	Name	Description	From	To
AB, AC and AD		Converted tourer	1923	1927
AE			1929	1930
RK		Converted RK saloon		
RM		Converted RL saloon		
RN		Converted RN saloon		
RP		Converted RP saloon	1933	
AVH				
AVJ and AVK		Converted Ruby		1939

== Motorsport ==
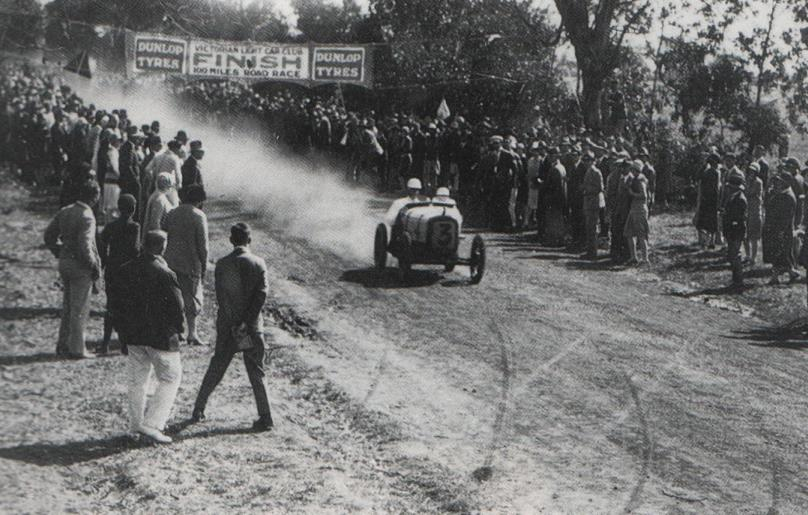
Arthur Waite won the 1928 100 Miles Road Race (later known as the 1928 Australian Grand Prix) driving an Austin 7.

In Australia Arthur Waite won the 1928 100 Miles Road Race driving an Austin 7. C E A Westcott did win the 1936 RAC Rally.
