= Sénéchal (automobile) =

Sénéchal et Cie.
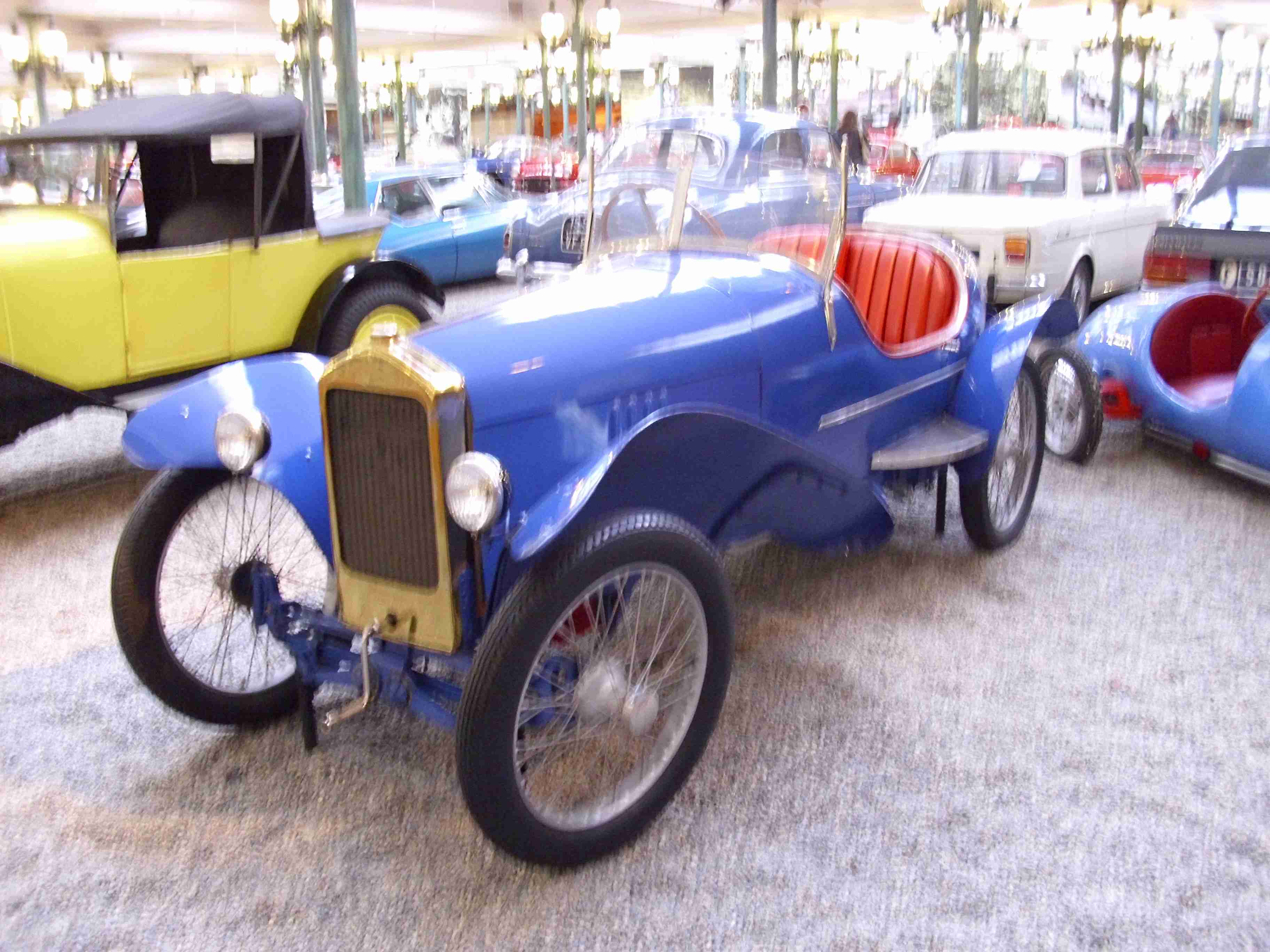
- Founded: 1921
- Defunct: 1929
- Headquarters: Courbevoie, France
- Key people: Robert Sénéchal
- Products: Cyclecars, Automobiles

Sénéchal was a French automobile manufacturer between 1921 and 1929.

== The founder ==
Robert Sénéchal (1892-1985) was a racing driver, an aviation pioneer and an industrialist. He was also the grandfather of the journalist and motor-sport innovator Patrick Zaniroli.

== The business ==
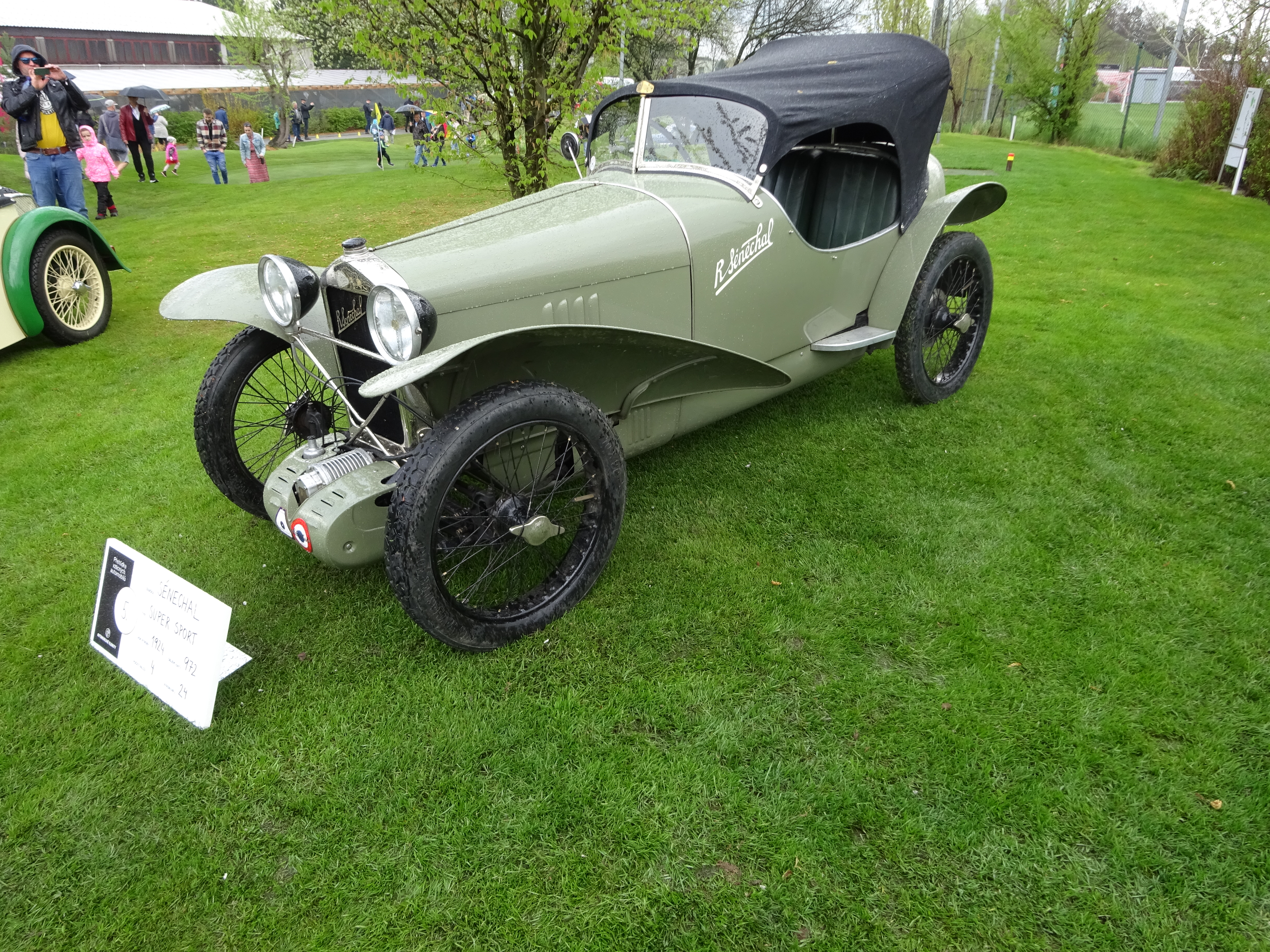
Senéchal Super Sport, roadster (1924)

In 1921 Sénéchal founded the automotive business that bore his name at Courbevoie. The origins of the business went back to the "Eclair" cyclecar business in which Sénéchal had briefly been involved. Sénéchal was himself a celebrity in the automotive world, and his cycle cars were an immediate success. It was impossible to satisfy demand for the vehicles from the manufacturer's small premises at Courbevoie, and Sénéchal therefore negotiated a deal with Chenard & Walcker, who had no model of their own in the cyclecar class and from 1923 agreed to take on the manufacturing of the Sénéchal models. As the economy grew the cyclecar boom that had driven the earlier "Eclair" and "Sénéchal" businesses, and Sénéchal moved up a notch to become a producer of light cars in the voiturette class.

In 1925 the name of the business changed from Sénéchal to Société Industrielle et Commerciale, and the business was taken over by Chenard & Walcker. Voiturettes continued to be produced, powered by Chenard & Walcker engines, until 1929. Robert Sénéchal himself suffered a serious racing accident in 1931, after which he moved away from the world of motor racing and automobile manufacturer, embarking instead on a career as an aerial photographer.

== The cars ==
The company manufactured small open-topped two seaters. Engines were bought in from specialists such as Ruby, and, less frequently, Train or Chapuis-Dornier

By the time of the 19th Paris Motor Show in October 1924, the Sénéchal range comprised two cyclecars. These were a 6 HP model with a 972cc engine and a 7HP with an 1100 cc power unit. The two of them sat respectively on wheelbases of 2,300 mm (90.6 in) and 2,450 mm (96.5 in), and were priced by the manufacturer at 12,600 francs and 14,900 francs.

There was again a Sénéchal stand at the 22ndMotor Show in October 1928, now advertising two voiturettes fitted with Chenard & Walcker engines of 7HP (1100 cc) and 9HP (1500 cc). However, this was Sénéchal's final motor show appearance, as production came to an end during 1929.

== Reading list ==
- Harald Linz, Halwart Schrader: Die Internationale Automobil-Enzyklopädie. United Soft Media Verlag, München 2008, ISBN 978-3-8032-9876-8. (in German)
- George Nick Georgano (Chefredakteur): The Beaulieu Encyclopedia of the Automobile. Volume 3: P–Z. Fitzroy Dearborn Publishers, Chicago 2001, ISBN 1-57958-293-1. (English)
- George Nick Georgano: Autos. Encyclopédie complète. 1885 à nos jours. Courtille, Paris 1975. (French)
