= VBL =

VBL or Vbl may refer to:

- VBL (inbrafiltro), a Brazilian armoured vehicle
- Véhicule Blindé Léger, a French armoured vehicle
- Verkehrsbetriebe Luzern, the public transport operator for Lucerne, Switzerland
- Vasabladet, a Swedish-language newspaper published in Vaasa, Finland

== See also ==
- VBI (disambiguation)
