= Land Rover Defender =

Off-road 4x4 and pickup truck series produced by Land Rover

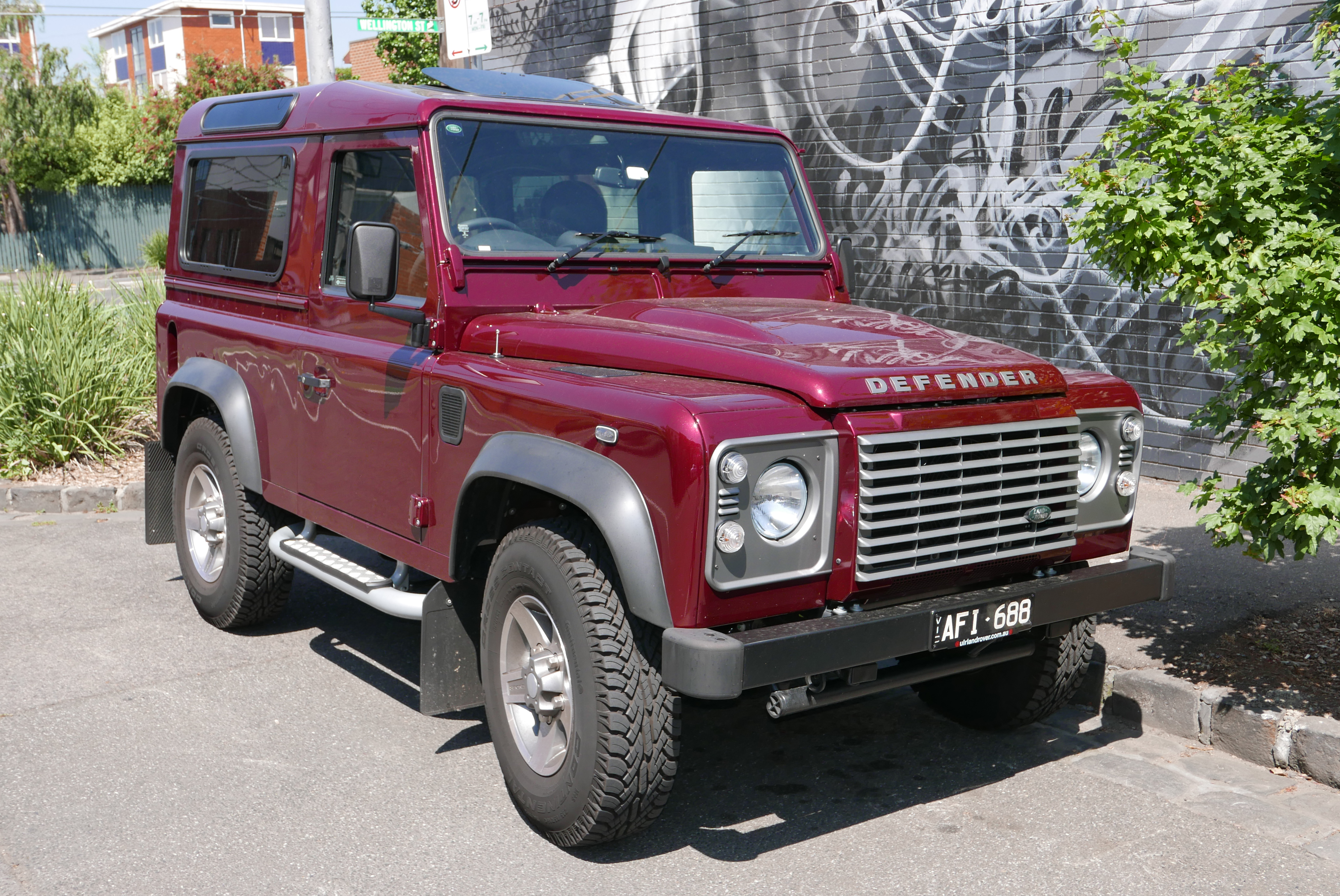
- 2015 Land Rover Defender 90 (Australia)

Overview
- Manufacturer: Land Rover (1983–2012); Jaguar Land Rover (2013–2016)
- Also called: Land Rover 90, Ninety, 110, One Ten, One Two Seven (1983–1990)
- Production: 1983–2016; Over 2 million Series/Defenders built since 1948
- Assembly: United Kingdom: Solihull (Solihull plant); CKD (Completely Knocked Down) kits: Australia: Moorebank; Brazil: São Paulo (Karmann); South Africa: Blackheath; Rosslyn; Silverton; Pakistan: Karachi (Sigma Motors); Turkey: Istanbul; Arifiye (Otokar); Malaysia: Shah Alam, Kulim (SMA); Jordan: Ma'an (Aqaba Assembly Plant); Kenya: Nairobi; Thailand: Rayong (Thai Swedish Assembly); Zimbabwe

Body and chassis
- Class: Small offroader (90); Medium sized offroader (110 & 130)
- Layout: Front engine, four-wheel drive

Chronology
- Predecessor: Land Rover Series III
- Successor: Land Rover Defender (L663)

The Land Rover Defender (introduced as the Land Rover One Ten, joined in 1984 by the Land Rover Ninety, plus the extra-length Land Rover One Two Seven in 1985) is a series of British off-road cars and pickup trucks. They have four-wheel drive, and were developed in the 1980s from the Land Rover series which was launched at the Amsterdam Motor Show in April 1948. Following the 1989 introduction of the Land Rover Discovery, "Land Rover" became the name of a broader marque, no longer the name of a specific model; thus, in 1990, Land Rover renamed them Defender 90, Defender 110 and Defender 130 respectively.

The vehicle, a British equivalent of the Second World War derived (Willys) Jeep, gained a worldwide reputation for ruggedness and versatility. With a steel ladder chassis and an aluminium alloy bodywork, the Land Rover originally used detuned versions of Rover engines.

Though the Defender was not a new generation design, it incorporated significant changes compared to the Land Rover series, such as adopting coil springs front and rear. Coil springs offered both better ride quality and improved axle articulation. The addition of a centre differential to the transfer case gave the Defender permanent four-wheel-drive capability. Both changes were derived from the original Range Rover, and the interiors were also modernised. Whilst the engines were carried over from the Series III, a new series of modern and more powerful engines was progressively introduced.

Even when ignoring the series Land Rovers and perhaps ongoing licence products, the 90/110 and Defender models' 33-year production run were ranked as the sixteenth longest single-generation car in history in 2020.

In 2020, Jaguar Land Rover introduced an all new generation of Land Rover Defender Land Rover Defender (L663) switching from body on chassis to integrated bodywork and from live, rigid axles to all around independent suspension.

== History ==
After a continuous run of 67 years production finally ended on 29 January 2016, after a total of just over two million Land Rover Series and Defender models had been built. The two millionth unit was assembled with the help of a special team in May 2015, and charitably auctioned for the International Federation of Red Cross and Red Crescent (IFRC) Societies later that year. The last Land Rover Defender, rolled off the production line, with the number plate H166 HUE, a reference to the first ever pre-production Land Rover, registration 'HUE 166'. This was the 2,016,933rd Defender to be produced.

A special edition Defender Works V8, with 400 bhp (298 kW), was announced in January 2018. Until 2020, the Defender was last sold in North America in 1997 due to low sales and modifications required to comply with updated safety standards.

An all-new 2020 Land Rover Defender made its global debut in September 2019 and was initially offered with two wheelbase options. This new model, which shares no components or technology with its predecessor, has an aluminium monocoque body.

== Name and badge distinctions ==
The coil-sprung Land Rover was introduced in 1983 as "Land Rover One Ten", and in 1984 the "Land Rover Ninety" was added – the numbers representing the respective wheelbases in inches (despite the Ninety was 92.9-inches.) The number was spelled in full in advertising and in handbooks and manuals, and the vehicles also carried badges above the radiator grille which read "Land Rover 90" or "Land Rover 110", with the number rendered numerically. The Ninety and One Ten replaced the earlier Land Rover Series, and at the time of launch, the only other Land Rover model in production was the Range Rover.

In 1989, a third model was brought out by Land Rover to be produced in parallel with the other two: the Land Rover Discovery. To avoid possible confusion, the 1991 model year Ninety and the One Ten were renamed the "Defender 90" and "Defender 110". These carried front badges that said "Defender", with a badge on the rear of the vehicle saying "Defender 90" or "Defender 110". The L316 model, from 2007 to 2016, still featured the space above the radiator for the badge but was blank. Instead it had "Land Rover" spelled across the leading edge of the bonnet in raised individual letters, in keeping with the Discovery and Freelander. At the rear was a new style of '"Defender" badge with an underlining "swoosh". On these last models there are no badges defining the wheelbase model of the vehicle.

The 127-inch (3,226 mm) wheelbase Land Rover One Two Seven, available from 1985, was always marketed with the name rendered numerically. Following the adoption of the Defender name, it became the "Defender 130", although the wheelbase remained unchanged.

The North American Specification (NAS) Defender 110 sold for the 1993 model year carried a badge above the radiator grille which read "Defender", whereas the NAS Defender 90 sold for the 1994 to 1997 model years had "Land Rover" spelled across the top of the radiator grille in individual letter decals. NAS Defenders also carried a cast plaque on the rear tub in the original style of the Series estate cars with "Defender 110" or "Defender 90" below the Land Rover lozenge and the vehicle's unique limited edition production run number.

== Land Rover Ninety and One Ten ==
Ninety, One Ten and One Two Seven
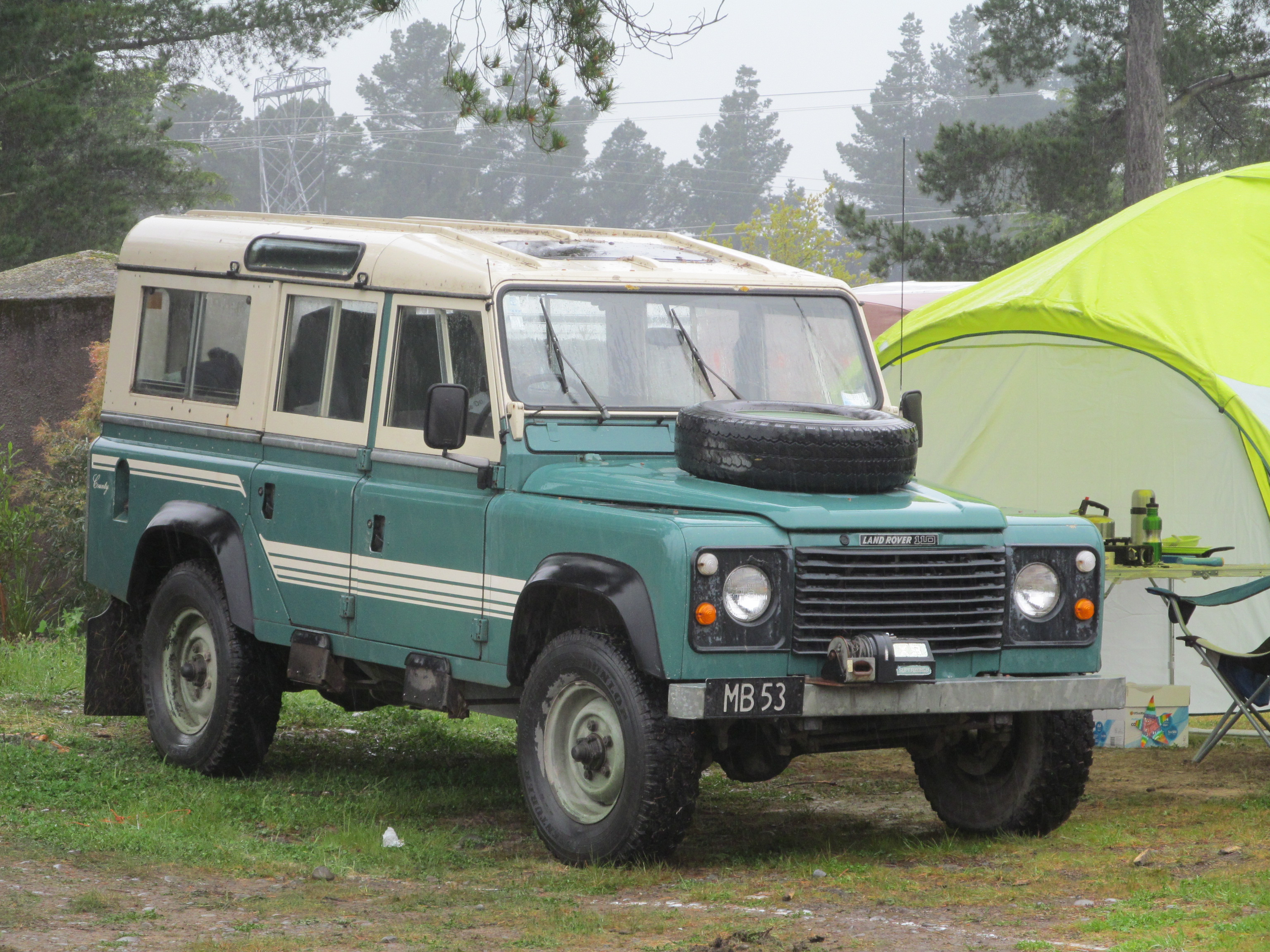
- 1985 Land Rover 110 County

Overview
- Production: One Ten: 1983–1990; Ninety: 1984–1990; One Two Seven: 1985–1990

Body and chassis
- Body style: 3-door 4x4; 5-door 4x4; 2-door pickup; 3-door panel truck
- Related: Land Rover Wolf; Santana PS-10

Powertrain
- Engine: petrol: 2.25 L 10H I4 (1983–1985); 2.5 L 17H I4 (1985–1993); 3.5 L Rover V8 V8 (1983–1993); diesel: 2.25 L 10J I4 (1983); 2.5 L 11J/12J I4 (1984–1993); 2.5 L 19J turbo I4 (1986–1990)
- Transmission: 4-speed LT95 manual; 5-speed LT77 manual; 5-speed LT85 manual

Dimensions
- Wheelbase: 92.9 in (2,360 mm) (90); 110 in (2,794 mm) (110); 127 in (3,226 mm) (127)
- Length: 160.5 in (4,077 mm) (90); 181.1 in (4,600 mm) (110)
- Width: 70.5 in (1,791 mm)
- Height: 80.2 in (2,037 mm) (90); 84 in (2,134 mm) (110)

Production of the model now known as the Defender began in 1983 as the Land Rover One Ten, a name which reflected the 110-inch (2,800mm) length of the wheelbase. The Land Rover Ninety, with 92.9-inch (2,360 mm) wheelbase, and Land Rover 127, with 127-inch (3,226 mm) wheelbase, soon followed. All measurements were metric, but communicated in the closest imperial terms familiar to the predecessor Series 3 88” and 109” models.

Superficially, there is little to distinguish the post-1983 vehicles from the Series III Land Rover. A full-length bonnet, revised grille, plus the fitting of wheel arch extensions to cover wider-track axles are the most noticeable changes. Initially the conservative engineering department insisted that the One Ten was also available with a part-time 4WD system familiar to derivatives produced since 1949. However, the part-time system failed to sell and was quickly dropped from the options list by 1984. While the engines and other body panels carried over from the Series III, mechanically the Ninety and One Ten were modernised, including:

- Coil springs, offering a more compliant ride and improved axle articulation
- A permanent four-wheel-drive system derived from the Range Rover, featuring a two-speed transfer gearbox with a lockable centre differential
- A modernised interior
- A taller one-piece windscreen
- Uprated engines: One diesel and two petrol

The One Ten was launched in 1983, and the Ninety followed in 1984. From 1984, wind-up windows were fitted (Initial 110s had sliding panels), and a 2.5-litre (153 cu in), 68 horsepower (51 kW) diesel engine was introduced. This was based on the earlier 2.25-litre (137 cu in) engine, but with increased capacity. A low compression version of the 3.5-litre (214 cu in) V8 Range Rover engine improved performance. It was initially available in the 110 with a Range Rover LT95 four-speed transmission with integral transfer case and vacuum operated differential lock, then later in conjunction with a high strength "Santana" five-speed transmission.

=== L315 model ===
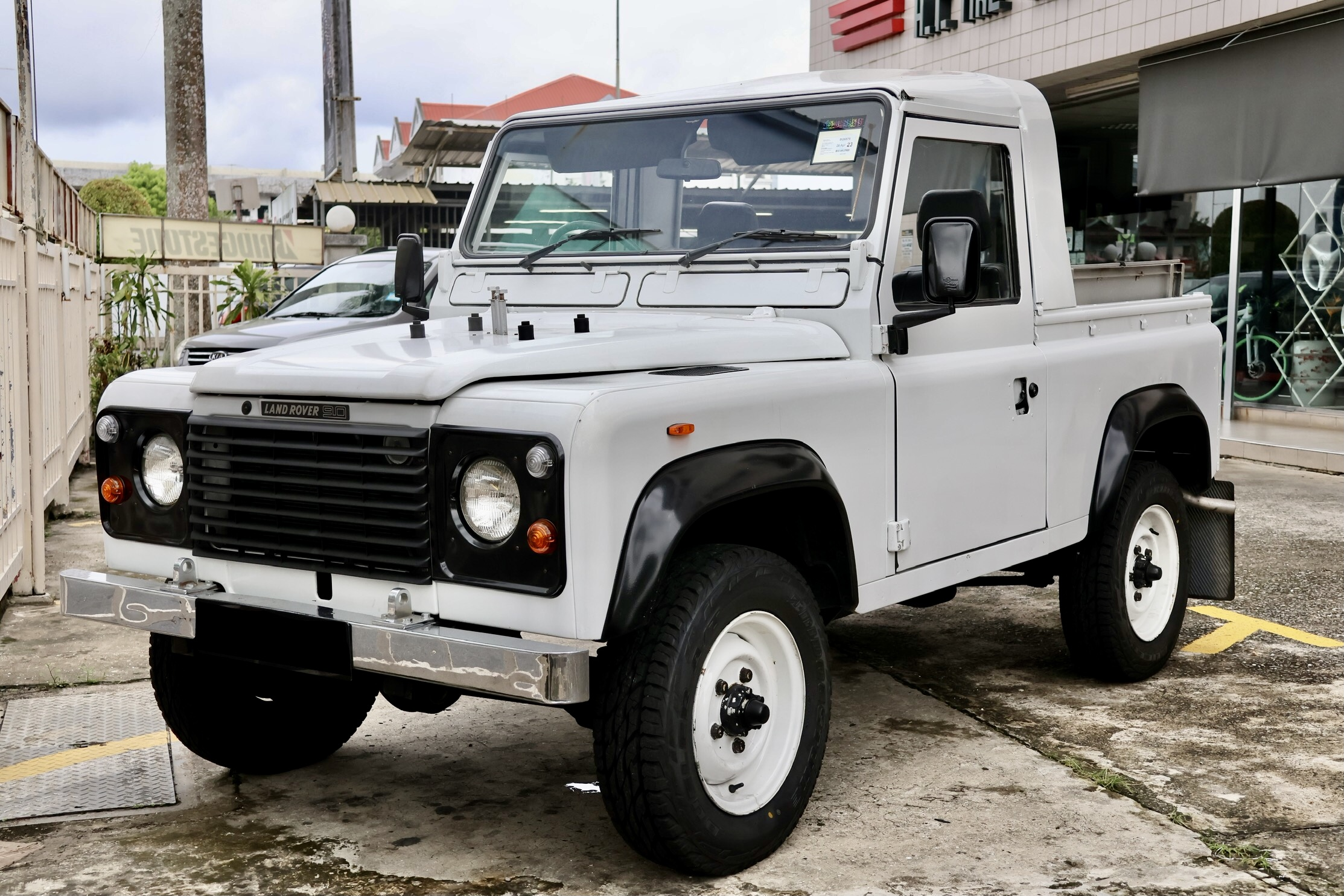
Land Rover Ninety pickup

In recognition of a number of changes the Defender is designated as L315 Land Rover from model year 1987 to 2006. This period saw Land Rover market the utility Land Rover as a private recreational vehicle. While the basic pick-up, 4x4 and van versions were still working vehicles, the County 4x4s were sold as multi-purpose family vehicles, featuring improved interior trim and more comfortable seats. This change was reflected in Land Rover starting what had long been common practice in the car industry: detail changes and improvements to the County model from year to year in order to attract new buyers and to encourage existing owners to trade in for a new vehicle. These changes included different exterior styling graphics and colour options, and the introduction of new options such as radio-cassette players, air-conditioning, Rostyle wheels, headlamp wash and wipe systems, as well as accessories such as surfboard carriers and bike racks.

=== The One Two Seven ===
From 1983, Land Rover introduced a third wheelbase to its utility line-up, a 127-inch (3,226 mm) wheelbase vehicle designed to accommodate larger, heavier loads than the One Ten. Called the "Land Rover One Two Seven", it was designed specifically with use by utility companies in mind, as well as military usage. In its standard form, it is a four-door six-seater consisting of the front half of a One Ten 4x4, and the rear of a One Ten high-capacity pick up (HCPU). Logic was that this allowed a workcrew and their equipment to be carried in one vehicle at the same time. The One Two Seven could carry up to a 1.4 tonnes (1.4 long tons; 1.5 short tons) payload, compared to the 1.03 tonnes (1.01 long tons; 1.14 short tons) payload of the One Ten and the 0.6 tonnes (0.59 long tons; 0.66 short tons) of the Ninety.

Land Rover One Two Sevens were built on a special production line, and all started life as One Ten 4x4 chassis (the model was initially marketed as the One Ten crew cab, before the more logical One Two Seven name was adopted). These were then cut in two and the 17 inches (432 mm) of extra chassis length welded on before the two original halves were reunited. These models did not receive their own dedicated badging like the other two models: instead they used the same metal grille badges as used on the Series III 109 V8 models, that simply said "Land-Rover". Although the standard body-style was popular, the One Two Seven was a common basis for conversion to specialist uses, such as mobile workshops, ambulances, fire engines and flatbed transports. In South Africa, the Land Rover assembly plant offered a One Two Seven 4x4 with seating for 15. Land Rover also offered the One Two Seven as a bare chassis, with just front bodywork and bulkhead, for easy conversion.

Initially held back by the low power of the Land Rover engines (other than the thirsty petrol V8 engine), the One Two Seven benefited from the improvements to the line-up, and by 1990 was only available with the two highest power engines, the 134 hp (100 kW) 3.5-litre V8 petrol, and the 85 hp (63 kW) 2.5-litre turbo diesel .

=== Engine development ===
The original One Ten of 1983 was available with the same engine line-up as the Series III vehicles it replaced, namely 2.25-litre (137 cu in) petrol and diesel engines, and a 3.5-litre (210 cu in) V8 petrol unit. In 1981, the 2.25 L engines were upgraded from three- to five-crankshaft bearings in preparation for the planned increases in capacity and power. The five bearing version was known as the 2.3-litre to differentiate it despite having the same displacement.

The 2.5-litre version of the diesel engine, displacing 2,495 cubic centimetres (152.3 cu in) and producing 68 hp (51 kW), was introduced in both the One Ten and the newly arrived Ninety. This was a long-stroke version of the venerable 2.25-litre unit, fitted with updated fuel injection equipment and a revised cylinder head for quieter, smoother and more efficient running. A timing belt also replaced the older engine's chain. Despite these improvements the engine was underpowered and unrefined in comparison with the competition.

In 1985 the petrol units were upgraded. An enlarged four-cylinder engine was introduced. This 83 hp (62 kW) engine shared the same block and cooling system (as well as other ancillary components) as the diesel unit. Unlike the diesel engine, this new 2.5-litre petrol engine retained the chain-driven camshaft of its 2.25-litre predecessor. At the same time, the 114 hp (85 kW) V8 was also made available in the Ninety: the first time a production short-wheelbase Land Rover had been given V8 power. The V8 on both models was now mated to an all-new five-speed LT85 manual gearbox.

The year 1986 saw improvements in engines to match the more advanced offerings by Japanese competitors. The "Diesel Turbo" engine was introduced in September, a lightly turbocharged version of the existing 2.5-litre diesel, with several changes to suit the higher power output, including a re-designed crankshaft, teflon-coated pistons and nimonic steel exhaust valves to cope with the higher internal temperatures. Similarly, an eight-bladed cooling fan was fitted, together with an oil cooler. The changes for the turbo diesel were kept as slight as possible, in the aim of making the car saleable in Land Rover's traditional export markets across the globe.

The 2.5 diesel, 2.5 petrol and Turbo Diesel engines all shared the same block castings and other components such as valve-gear and cooling system parts, allowing them to be built on the same production line. The Turbo Diesel produced 85 hp (63 kW), a 13% increase over the naturally aspirated unit, and a 31.5% increase in torque to 150 lb⋅ft (203 N⋅m) at 1,800 rpm. Externally, turbo diesel vehicles differed from other models only by having an air intake grille in the left-hand wing to supply cool air to the turbo. Early turbo-diesel engines gained a reputation for poor reliability, with major failures to the bottom-end and cracked pistons. A revised block and improved big end bearings were introduced in 1988, and a re-designed breather system in 1989. These largely solved the engine's problems, but it remained (like many early turbo-diesels) prone to failure if maintenance was neglected.

At the same time that the Turbo Diesel was introduced, the V8 engine was upgraded. Power was increased to 134 hp (100 kW), and SU carburettors replaced the Zenith models used on earlier V8s.

=== Sales turnaround ===
The new vehicles with their more modern engines, transmissions, and interiors reversed the huge decline in sales that took place in the 1980s (a 21% fall in a single year, 1980–1981). This growth was mainly in the domestic UK market and Europe. African, Australian and Middle-Eastern sales failed to recover significantly – Land Rover had not been immune to the poor reputation caused by substandard build quality and unreliability which had afflicted the rest of British Leyland, of which Land Rover was still part. In these markets Japanese vehicles such as the Toyota Landcruiser and Nissan Patrol gradually took over what had been a lucrative export market for Land Rover for decades. Meanwhile, the company itself adopted more modern practices, such as using marketing campaigns to attract new buyers who would not previously have been expected to buy a Land Rover. The operation was streamlined, with most of the satellite factories in the West Midlands that built parts for the Land Rover being closed and production brought into the Solihull factory, which was expanded.

== Speciality vehicles ==
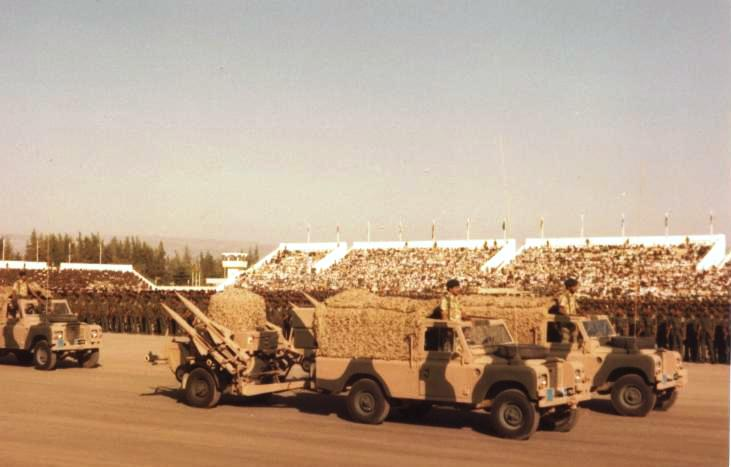
Omani Rapier and Land Rover

To maximise sales in Europe, Land Rover set up the Special Vehicles Division, which handled conversions, adaptations and limited production volume versions. The bulk of the division's work was the construction of stretched-wheelbase mobile workshops and crew carriers for British and European utility companies, often including six-wheel-drive conversions, but more unusual projects were undertaken, such as the construction of an amphibious Land Rover 90 used by the company as part of its sponsorship of Cowes Week from 1987 to 1990.

The Special Projects Division also handled specialised military contracts, such as the building of a fleet of 127-inch (3,226 mm) V8-powered Rapier missile launchers for the British Army. The Rapier system actually consisted of three Land Rovers: a One Two Seven which carried the launching and aiming equipment, and two One Tens which carried the crew and additional equipment.

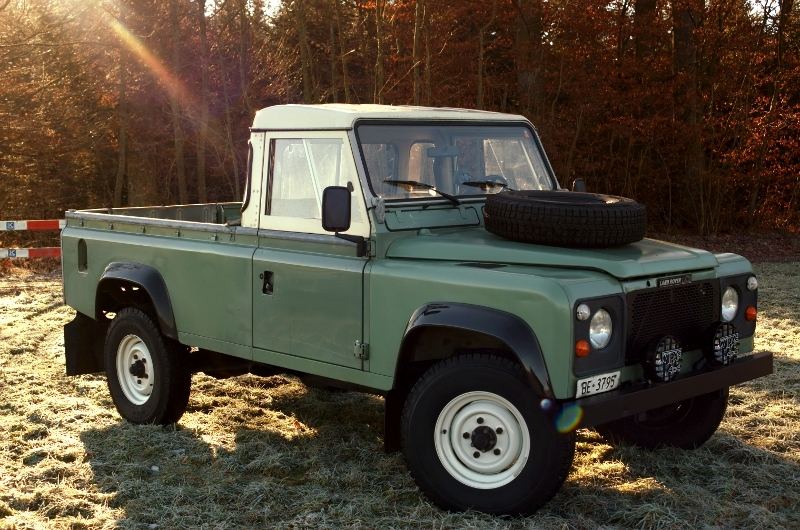
Land Rover 110 pickup

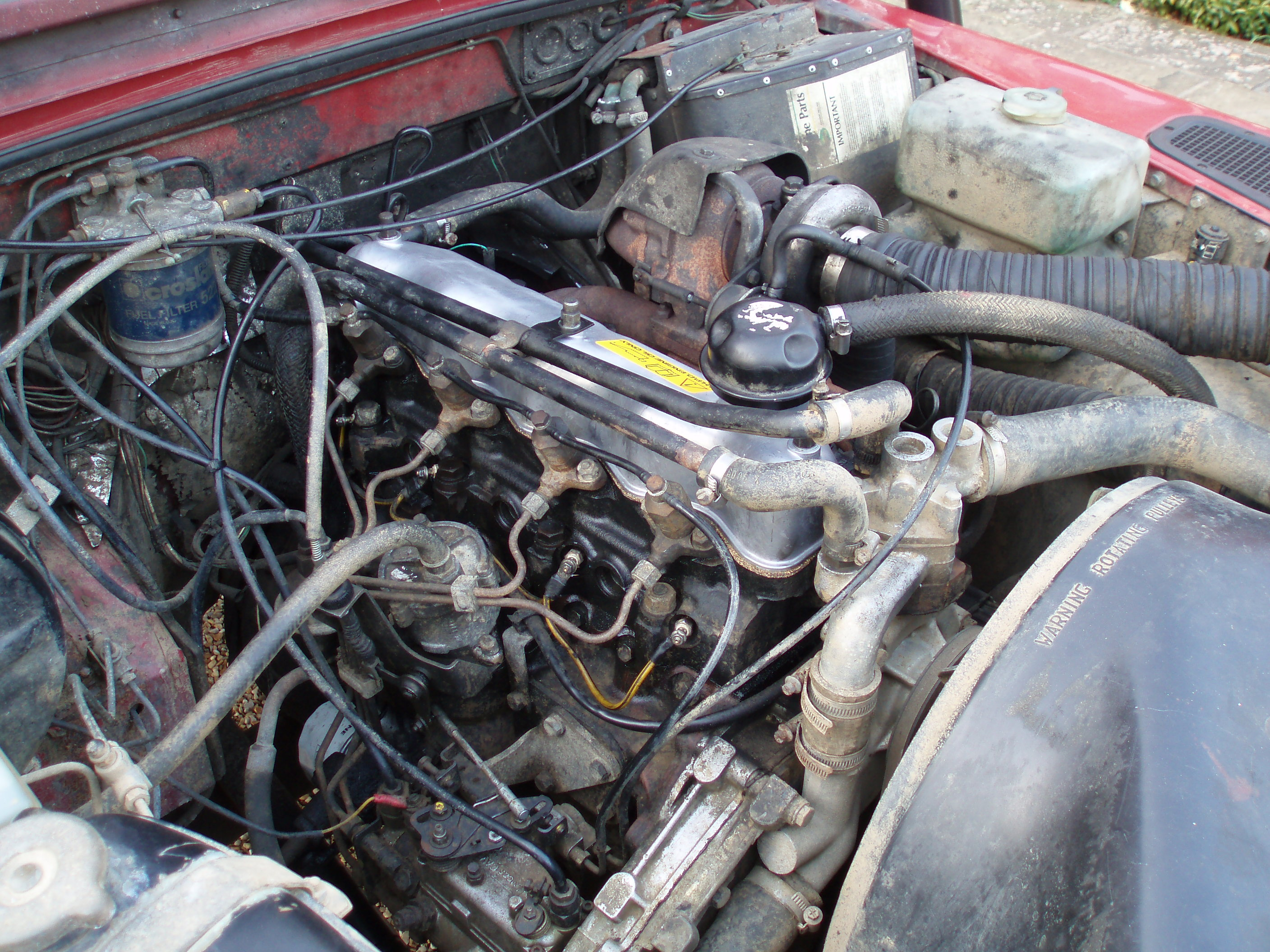
Diesel Turbo engine in a 1990 Land Rover Ninety

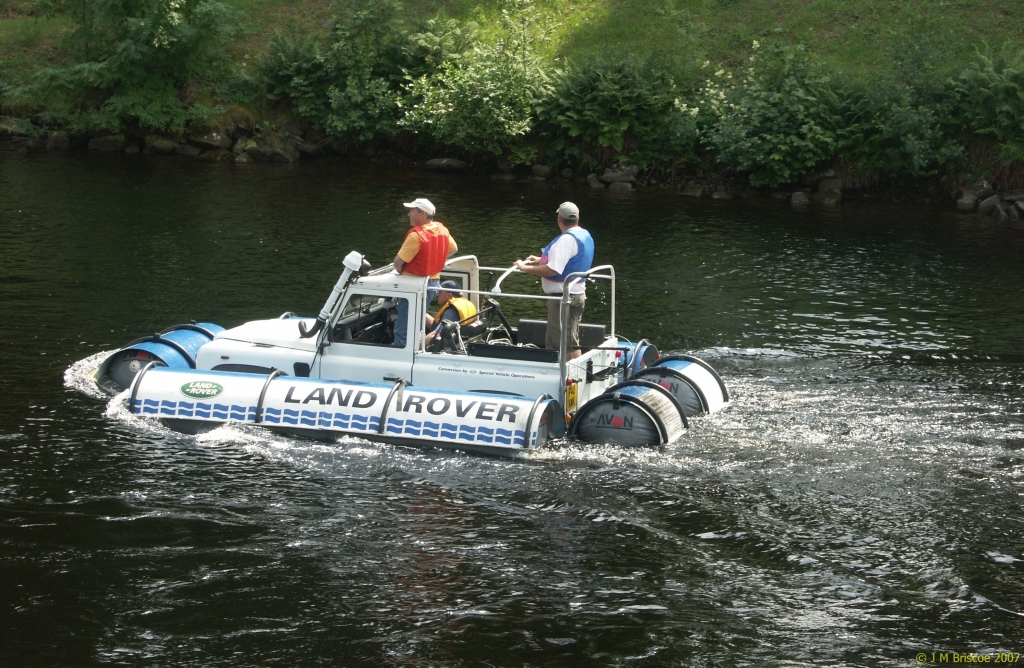
The amphibious 90 built in 1989 for the Cowes Week sponsorship events. The base vehicle is a standard Diesel Turbo soft top.

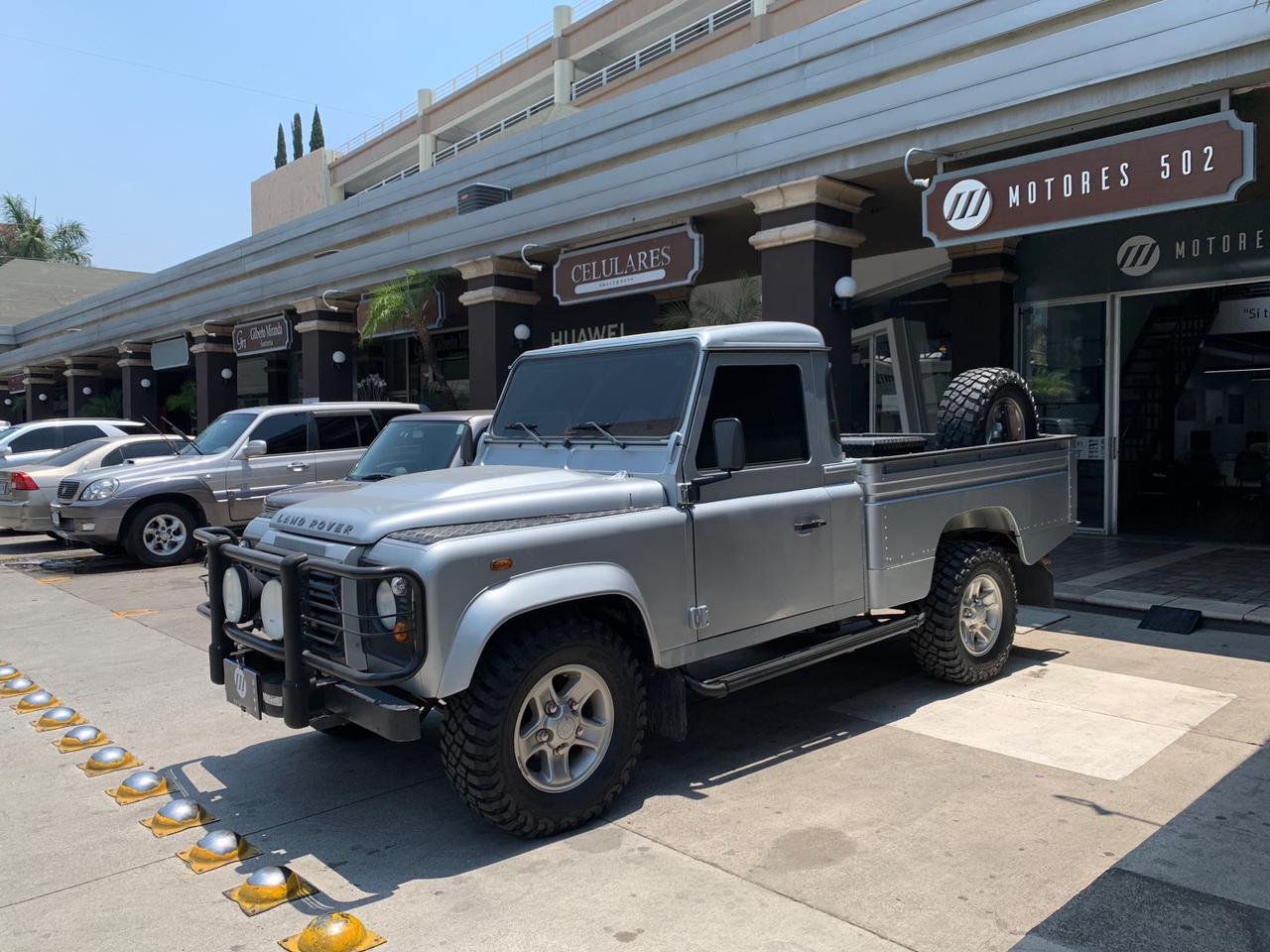
Land Rover Defender 110 2009

== Defender ==
Land Rover Defender
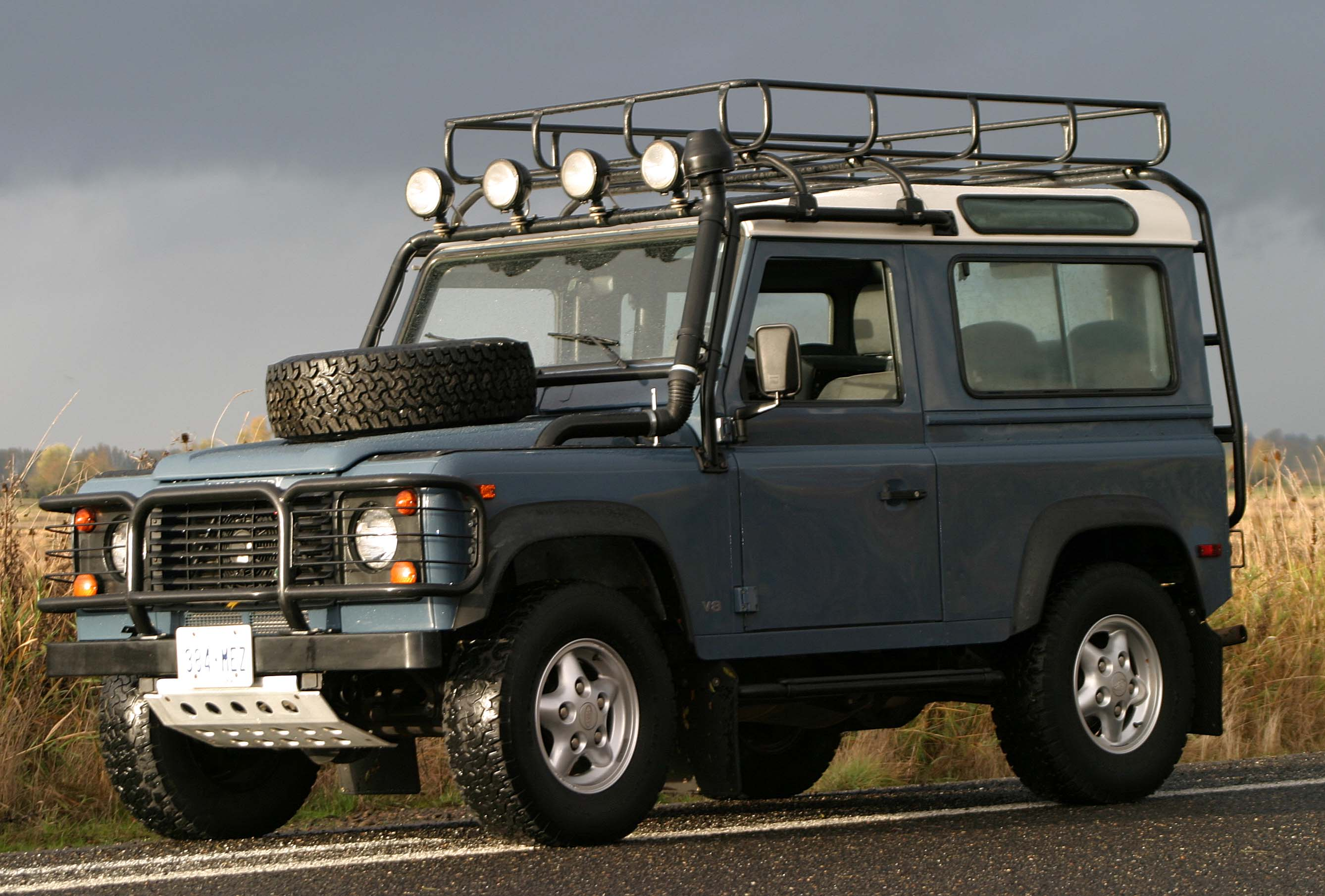

Overview
- Production: 1990–2016

Body and chassis
- Body style: 3/5-door 4x4; 2-door single cab pickup; 4-door double cab pickup; 2-door hardtop
- Related: Land Rover Wolf; Santana PS-10; Iveco Massif; MDT David

Powertrain
- Engine: petrol: 2.8 L BMW M52B28 I6 (ZA); 3.9 L Rover V8 V8; 5.0 L Jaguar AJ-V8 supercharged V8; diesel: 2.2 L Ford Duratorq turbo I4; 2.4 L Ford Duratorq turbo I4; 2.5 L 200 Tdi turbo I4; 2.5 L 300 Tdi turbo I4; 2.5 L Td5 turbo I5
- Transmission: 5-speed LT77 manual; 5-speed R380 manual; 4-speed ZF 4HP22 automatic; 6-speed GFT MT-82 manual

Dimensions
- Wheelbase: 92.9 in (2,360 mm) (90); 110 in (2,794 mm) (110); 127 in (3,226 mm) (130)
- Length: 144 in (3,658 mm) (90 pickup); 153 in (3,886 mm) (2000s 90); 172 in (4,369 mm) (110 Pickup); 182.3 in (4,630 mm) (2000s 110); 183 in (4,648 mm) (110 Hardtop); 174.7 in (4,437 mm); 157.1 in (3,990 mm) (1997-2000s 90); 160.5 in (4,077 mm) (1990–94 90); 181.1 in (4,600 mm) (1990s 110); 204 in (5,182 mm) (130)
- Width: 70.5 in (1,791 mm) (1990s); 70 in (1,778 mm) (2000s 90)
- Height: 80 in (2,032 mm) (2000s 90); 80.2 in (2,037 mm) (1990s 90); 80.0 in (2,032 mm) (110)

The biggest change to the Land Rover Series came in late 1990, when it became the Land Rover Defender. This was because in 1989 the company had introduced the Discovery model, requiring the original Land Rover to acquire a name. The Discovery also had a new turbodiesel engine, the 200TDi. This was also loosely based on the existing 2.5-litre turbo unit, and was built on the same production line, but had a modern alloy cylinder head, improved turbocharging, intercooling and direct injection. It retained the block, crankshaft, main bearings, cambelt system, and other ancillaries as the Diesel Turbo. The breather system included an oil separator filter to remove oil from the air in the system, thus finally solving the Diesel Turbo's main weakness of re-breathing its own sump oil. The 200Tdi, produced 107 hp (80 kW) and 195 lb⋅ft (264 N⋅m) of torque, which was nearly a 25% improvement on the engine it replaced (although as installed in the Defender the engine was de-tuned slightly from its original Discovery 111 hp (83 kW) specification due to changes associated with the turbo position and exhaust routing).

This engine finally allowed the Defender to cruise comfortably at high speeds, as well as tow heavy loads speedily on hills while still being economical. In theory, it only replaced the older Diesel Turbo engine in the range, with the other four-cylinder engines (and the V8 petrol engine) still being available. However, the Tdi's combination of performance and economy meant that it took the vast majority of sales. Exceptions were the British Army and some commercial operators, who continued to buy vehicles with the 2.5-litre naturally aspirated diesel engine (in the army's case, this was because the Tdi was unable to be fitted with a 24-volt generator). Small numbers of V8-engined Defenders were sold to users in countries with low fuel costs or who required as much power as possible (such as in Defenders used as fire engines and ambulances).

Along with the 200Tdi engine, the One Two Seven's name was changed to the "Land Rover Defender 130". The wheelbase remained the same; the new figure was simply a rounding up. More importantly, 130s were no longer built from "cut-and-shut" 110s, but had dedicated chassis built from scratch. The chassis retained the same basic structure as the 90 and 110 models, but with a longer wheelbase.

1994 saw another development of the Tdi engine, the 300Tdi. Although the 200Tdi had been a big step forward, it had been essentially a reworking of the old turbocharged diesel to accept a direct injection system. In contrast the 300Tdi was virtually new, despite the same capacity, and both the Defender and the Discovery had engines in the same state of tune, 111 bhp (83 kW), 195 lbf⋅ft (264 N⋅m).

Throughout the 1990s the vehicle attempted to climb more and more upmarket, while remaining true to its working roots. This trend was epitomised by limited-edition vehicles, such as the SV90 in 1992 with roll-over protection cage, alloy wheels and metallic paint and the 50th anniversary 90 in 1998, equipped with automatic transmission, air conditioning and Range Rover 4.0-litre V8 engine. Despite these improvements, the Defender in the UK continued to be sold in the taxation class of a commercial vehicle and therefore attracted Value Added Tax (VAT) whenever resold on the secondhand market.

A new variant was the Defender 110 double cab, featuring a 4x4-style seating area, with an open pick up back. Although prototypes had been built in the Series days, it was not until the late 1990s that this vehicle finally reached production.

=== BMW M52 engine ===
Land Rover South Africa offered a unique Defender during the period the group was owned by BMW. Between 1997 and 2001, the Defender 90 and 110 were offered with a BMW petrol engine alongside the normal Tdi engine. The engine was the BMW M52 2793 cc, straight-six, 24-valve engine as found in the BMW 328i, 528i, 728i, and the Z3. Power and torque output for this engine was 143 kW (192 hp) at 5,300 rpm and 280 N⋅m (207 lb⋅ft) at 3,950 rpm. This option was offered due to a demand for a petrol-driven alternative to the diesel engine after production of the V8 Defender had ended. The vehicles were built at Rosslyn outside Pretoria. Total production for the 2.8i was 1395, which included 656 Defender 90s and 739 Defender 110s. This is an estimate based on sales figures from the National Association of Automobile Manufacturers of South Africa (NAAMSA). Early models were not speed-restricted, but later models were limited to 160 km/h (99 mph).

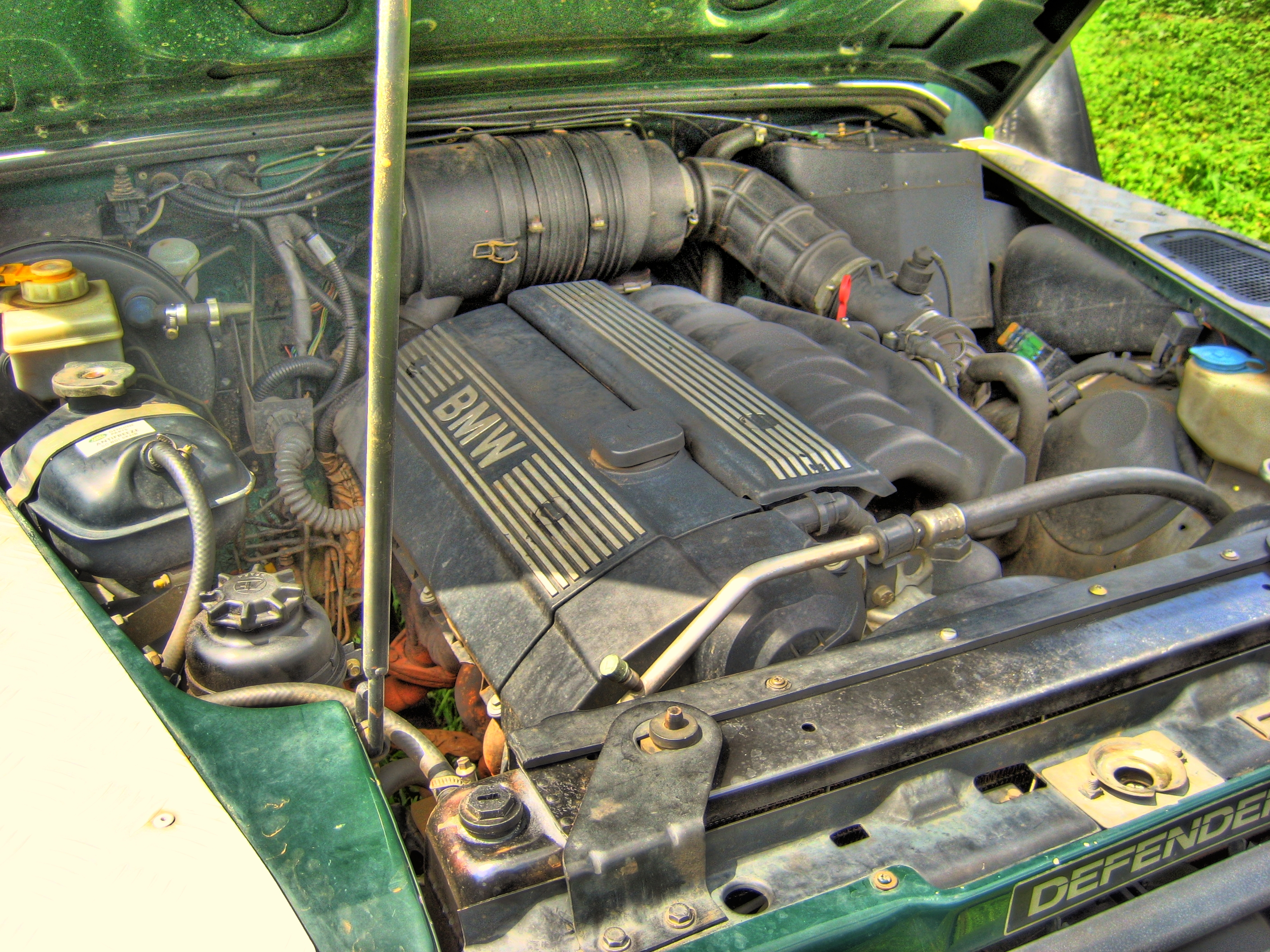
The South African Defender BMW-engined 2.8i (1997–2001)

The development of the Defender 2.8i began in February 1996 as a joint project between Land Rover and BMW, following the recent unification of the two companies. Some of BMW's top engineers including Frank Isenberg, head of BMW Driver Training and the F87 M2 project, were part of the development team. The project was initially top secret and in 2 to 3 weeks' time they had converted a Defender 110 that originally had a 3.5-litre V8 into the first 2.8i. To produce a 90 2.8i prototype a Defender 90 with a V8 chassis was required, but the local 3.5-litre version had ended production, so Land Rover UK sent a North American specification 1995 Defender 90 soft top model to South Africa which engineers turned into the first Defender 90 2.8i prototype. They nicknamed it "Green Mamba" due to its Coniston Green colour. To make the 2.8i Defenders ready for production, the prototypes were subjected to extensive testing. According to Land Rover South Africa, there were six prototype vehicles that were tested off-road and on-road for over 500,000 km total. The new BMW M52 Defender performed better than the V8 Defender it replaced in nearly every test.

To adapt the BMW M52 engine to the Defender chassis, the engineers were able to utilize some of the parts from the recently developed BMW M51 diesel-powered Range Rover 2.5 DSE. They used the clutch housing, clutch, flywheel, and slave cylinder from that vehicle to connect the engine to the R380 gearbox, but they had to produce a new clutch housing adaptor (bell housing) for the petrol M52 engine in the Defender. The unique clutch housing adaptor was necessary because the petrol M52 engine is tilted 10 degrees compared to the diesel M51 engine and it needed to be longer to match the input shaft of the R380 gearbox borrowed from the 300Tdi Defender. Due to the large diameter gearbox input shaft, the standard BMW pilot bearing could not be fitted, so a unique pilot bushing made of Oilite bronze was developed. It had an inside diameter of 7/8-inch with an outside diameter of 32 mm. A mixture of non-metric and metric specifications are common on Land Rovers. Other unique parts that were developed for the 2.8i were the air intake ducts both before and after the Donaldson FPG RadialSeal™ air cleaner, engine mounts, radiator cowl, cooling hoses, fuel lines, clutch lines, air conditioning system, engine wiring, tachometer gauge, exhaust system, and a specially tuned Siemens MS41.0 DME with a Lucas 10AS alarm in place of the Drive Away Protection system (EWS) used on BMWs. To compensate for lower torque output in the low range of the power band compared to the V8 and diesel engines, engineers fitted the 2.8i with a 1.667:1 gear ratio LT230 transfer box. This allowed power to be more readily available and made the vehicle particularly well suited for traversing a wide range of difficult terrain such as sand dunes. The high gear ratio also helped the 2.8i accelerate from 0–100 km/h (62 mph) in 9.3 seconds, making it the fastest production Defender ever made.

The exhaust system for both the 90 and 110 M52 Defender consists of two exhaust manifolds followed by two catalytic converters. There is not a version of the exhaust system without catalytic converters. The two pipes enter the rear silencer and a single pipe exits to the rear to complete the exhaust system. There are no oxygen sensors present.

The Defender 2.8i received some major changes part way into the 1999 model year. The new specification, called MY99, included new electrical systems similar to the Td5 with new gauges and switches, an updated chassis, a BMW aluminium radiator with integrated expansion tank, and a new fuel system consisting of nylon fuel lines and a new fuel tank with quick-connect fittings on the pump and fuel filter.

BMW South Africa created wiring diagrams for the Defender 2.8i. The document splits diagrams into two categories as Pre MY99 and MY99.

=== Td5 engine ===
In 1998, the Defender was fitted with an all-new 2.5-litre, five-cylinder in-line turbodiesel engine, badged the Td5. The Tdi could not meet upcoming Euro III emissions regulations so the Td5 replaced the Tdi as the only available power unit. The engine used electronic control systems and produced 122 hp (91 kW) at 4,850 rpm, 11 hp (8 kW) more than the Tdi, with improved refinement. Traditionalists were critical of the electronic systems deployed throughout the vehicle, but concerns that these would fail when used in extreme conditions proved unfounded.

For the 2002 model year, further refinements were made to the Td5 engine to help it achieve ever-more stringent emission regulations. The "XS" 4x4 was introduced in 2002 as a top-specification level and the "County" package could be applied to every model in the line-up. XS models come with many "luxury" features, such as heated windscreen, heated seats, air conditioning, ABS and traction control and part-leather seats. At the same time, other detail improvements were made including a dash centre console, improved instrument illumination and the availability of front electric windows for the first time on a Defender. The design faults of the two-piece rear 4x4 door were finally eradicated with a one-piece door featuring a rubber weather sealing strip for the rear window.

=== L316 model ===
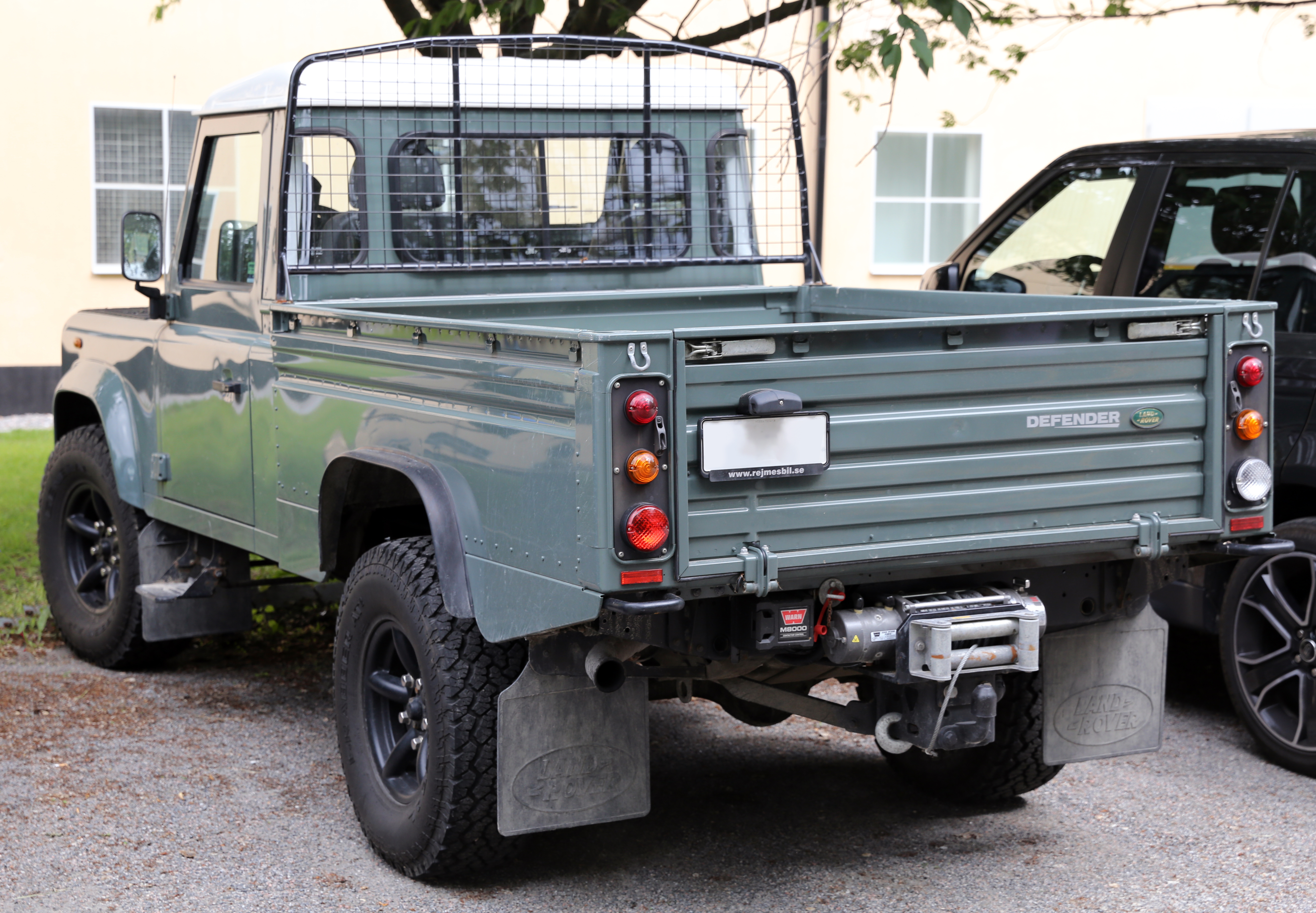
2009 Defender 110 pickup

From spring 2007, a series of changes were made to the Defender, most of which were implemented to meet emissions and safety legislation. The biggest change was to the drivetrain. The Td5 engine was replaced by an engine from Ford's DuraTorq line (AKA the Puma engine), built in their factory in Dagenham, making the Td5 the last Land Rover engine to be built in-house at Solihull. The engine chosen was from the ZSD family, being a version of the 2.4-litre four-cylinder unit also used in the highly successful Ford Transit. The engine's lubrication and sealing system was adapted for use in wet, dusty conditions and to maintain lubrication at extreme angles in off-road use. The power level remained the same at 122 hp (91 kW), but with a lower power peak speed for towing and better acceleration. Torque output rose from 221 lb⋅ft (300 N⋅m) to 265 lb⋅ft (359 N⋅m) due to the fitting of a variable-geometry turbocharger. This produced a wider spread of torque than the Td5, from 1,500 rpm to 2,000 rpm. The engine was mated to a new six-speed gearbox. First gear is lower than the previous gearbox for better low-speed control, whilst the higher sixth gear is intended to reduce noise and fuel consumption at high speeds.

The other major changes were to the interior. The dashboard layout of the original 110 from 1983 (which was in turn very similar to that used on the Series III from 1971) was replaced with a full-width fascia and different instrumentation. Instruments came from the Discovery 3, and some of the centre panels come from the Ford Transit. Whilst some interior fittings from the British Leyland parts bin – some of which dated back to the 1970s – were finally dropped, the steering column switchgear (sourced from the Mk.1 Austin Metro) and the ignition switch (from the Morris Marina) were carried over from the previous interior. A new heater and ventilation system improved de-misting and heater performance.

Other interior changes were to the seating layout. Legislation from the European Union outlaws the inward-facing seats used in the rear of previous Land Rover 4x4s. The 2007 Defender replaced the four inward-facing seats with two forward-facing seats. This made the Defender 90 4x4 a four-seater vehicle (reduced from six or seven), and the Defender 110 4x4 a seven-seater (reduced from nine). This brought the Defender in line with its competitors which have generally used this layout for many years. A new bodystyle was introduced on the 110 4x4 chassis- the "utility". This was a five-door 4x4 body but with the rearmost seats removed and the rear side panels left without windows, producing a five-seater vehicle with a secure, weatherproof load space.

The only external design alterations were minor detail changes. The bonnet was reshaped with a pressed bulge to allow the new, taller engine to fit in the engine bay whilst meeting pedestrian safety laws. This also avoided the need to re-design the engine sump to clear the axle. The new dashboard and ventilation system necessitated the removal of the distinctive air vent flaps underneath the windscreen which had been a feature of previous Land Rover utility models since the 1950s. While the flaps were deleted, the bulkhead pressing remained the same, so the outlines of where the flaps would be are still present. Passenger and rear loading doors were re-engineered to reduce corrosion and galvanic reaction. All other panels retained the same shape and styling that is viewed by enthusiasts as "iconic".

At the other extreme, basic models are available for commercial users, such as emergency services. The models are sold in over 140 countries. A range of special conversions are available that include hydraulic platforms, fire engines, mobile workshops, ambulances, and breakdown recovery trucks. The 130 remains available with the five-seater HCPU bodystyle as standard.

=== 2012 updates ===
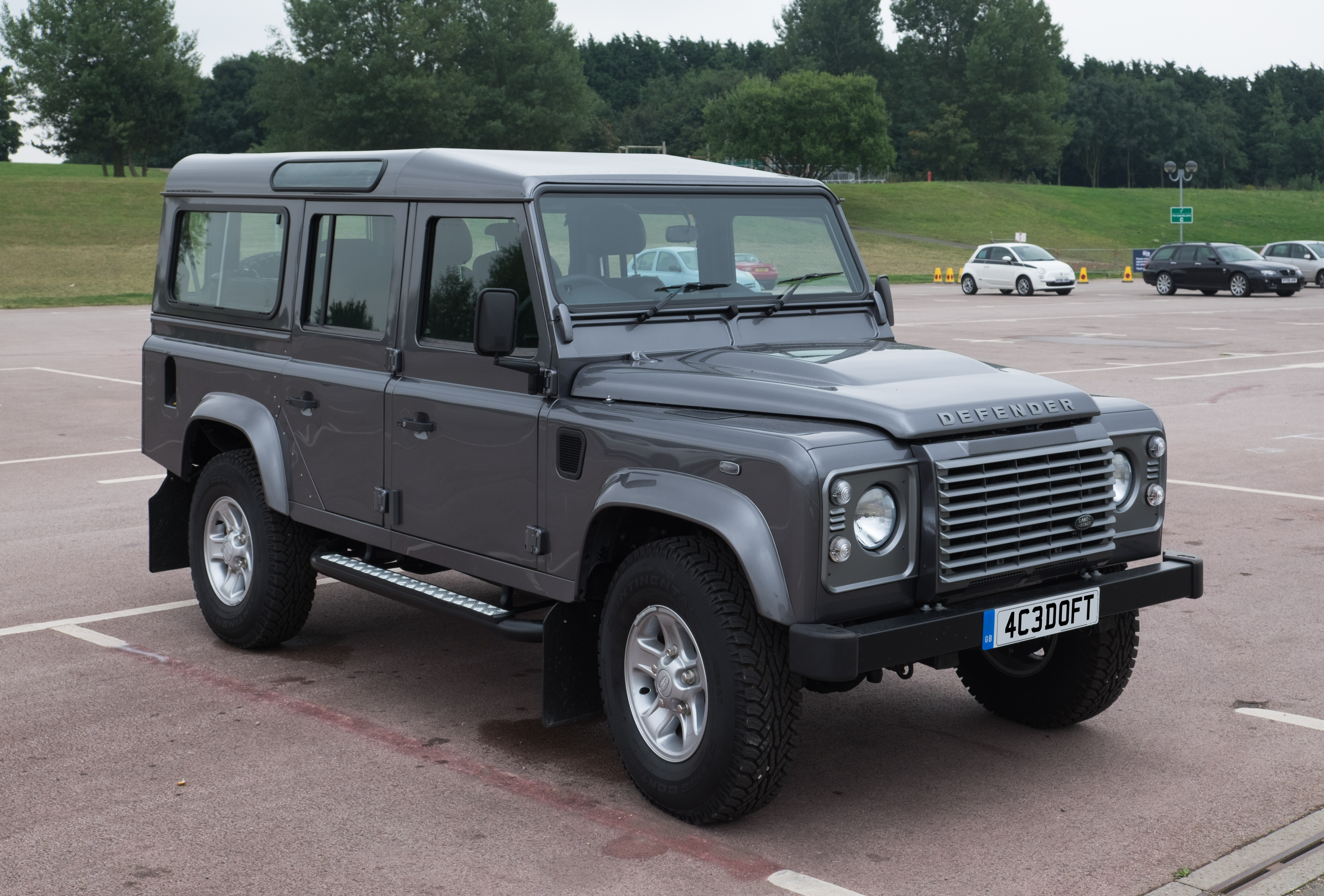
2016 Defender 110 estate

In August 2011, Land Rover announced an update of the Defender for the 2012 model year. By this time, Land Rover publicly acknowledged that it was working on a project to produce an all-new replacement for the Defender. This would lead to the unveiling of the first DC100 concept vehicle in September that year. While emissions and safety regulations have threatened the Defender since the early 2000s, these had either been avoided or Land Rover had found ways to modify the vehicle to economically meet the new requirements. However, safety regulations due for introduction in 2015 requiring minimum pedestrian safety standards and the fitment of airbags to commercial vehicles cannot be met without a wholesale redesign of the Defender.

The main change for the 2012 models was the installation of a different engine from the Ford Duratorq engine range. Ford decided, due to cost reasons, not to modify the 2.4-litre engine introduced in 2007 to meet the upcoming Euro V emissions standards and so the engine was replaced with the ZSD-422 engine, essentially a 2.2-litre variant of the same engine. Although smaller than the existing unit the power and torque outputs remained unchanged and the same six-speed gearbox was used as well. The engine included a diesel particulate filter for the first time on a Defender. The only other change was the reintroduction of the soft top body style to the general market. This had been a popular option for the Land Rover Series but by then the introduction of the Defender had been relegated to special order and military buyers only. Land Rover stated that the option was being brought back due to customer feedback. The last Defender, a soft-top "90" rolled off the Solihull production line at 9:22 on Friday 29 January 2016. The BBC reported that the Defender's replacement was due to be launched in 2018/2019.

== DC100 Concept ==
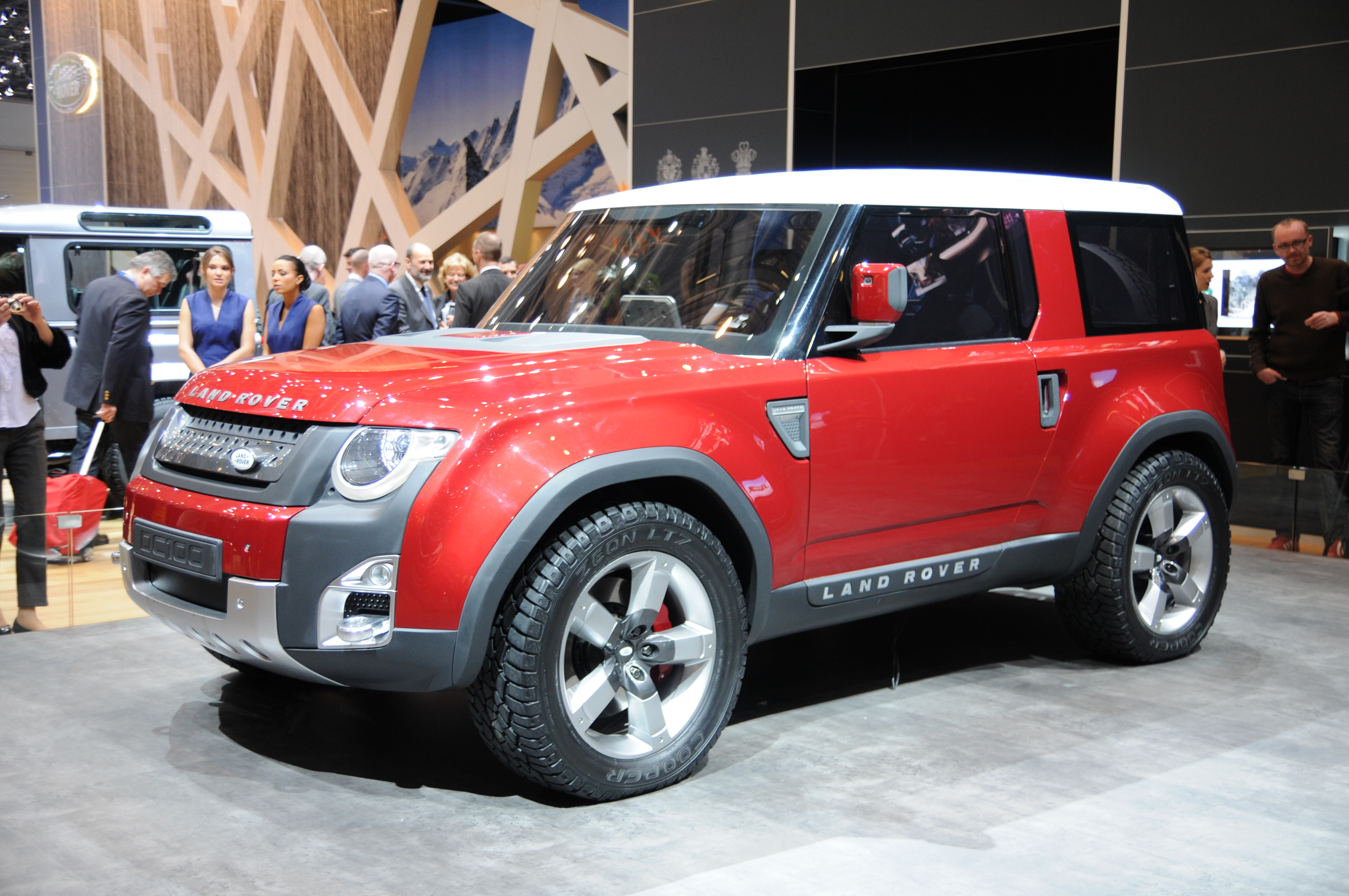
Land Rover DC100

The need for total replacement of the Defender has been brought about by 2015's new European regulations regarding crash safety for pedestrians (Euro NCAP) that render the Defender's design obsolete. The Defender also did not meet U.S. safety requirements after 1997 and since then Land Rover offered U.S. buyers the more luxurious LR2 (Freelander) and LR4 (Discovery) and Range Rover instead.

Land Rover unveiled the DC100 and its topless counterpart, the DC100 Sport, at the 2011 Frankfurt Motor Show. The designs of the concept vehicles received some criticism in the press. The DC100 (Defender Concept 100") is a conventional three-door off-roader with a 2.0-litre turbo-charged diesel engine and the DC100 Sport is a two-passenger pick-up with a 2.0-litre petrol engine. Unlike the current Defender with 93-inch, 110-inch and 130-inch wheelbases, the DC100 was presented in 100-inch wheelbase only.

== 2020 Defender (L663; 2020–) ==
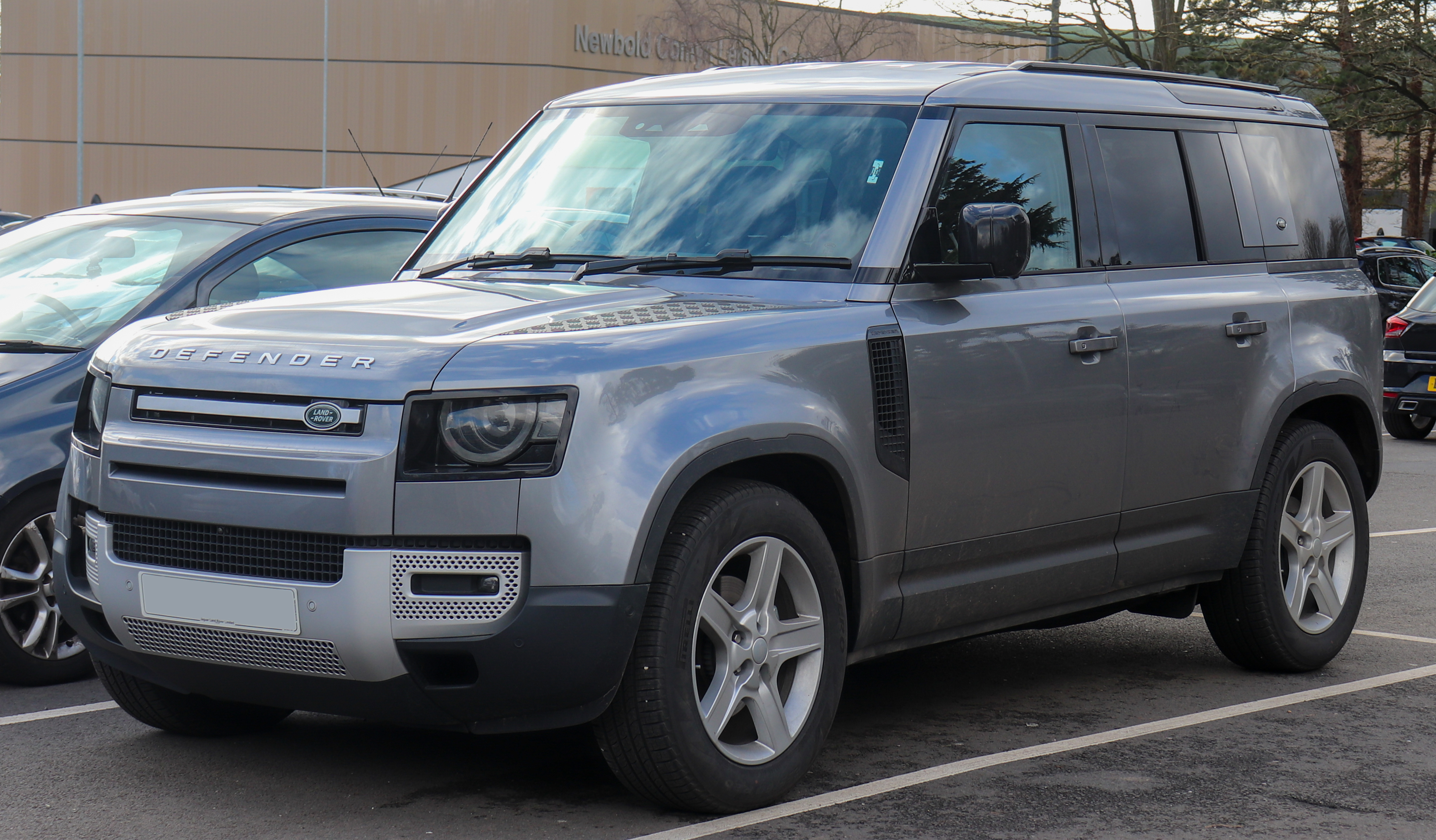
2020 Land Rover Defender

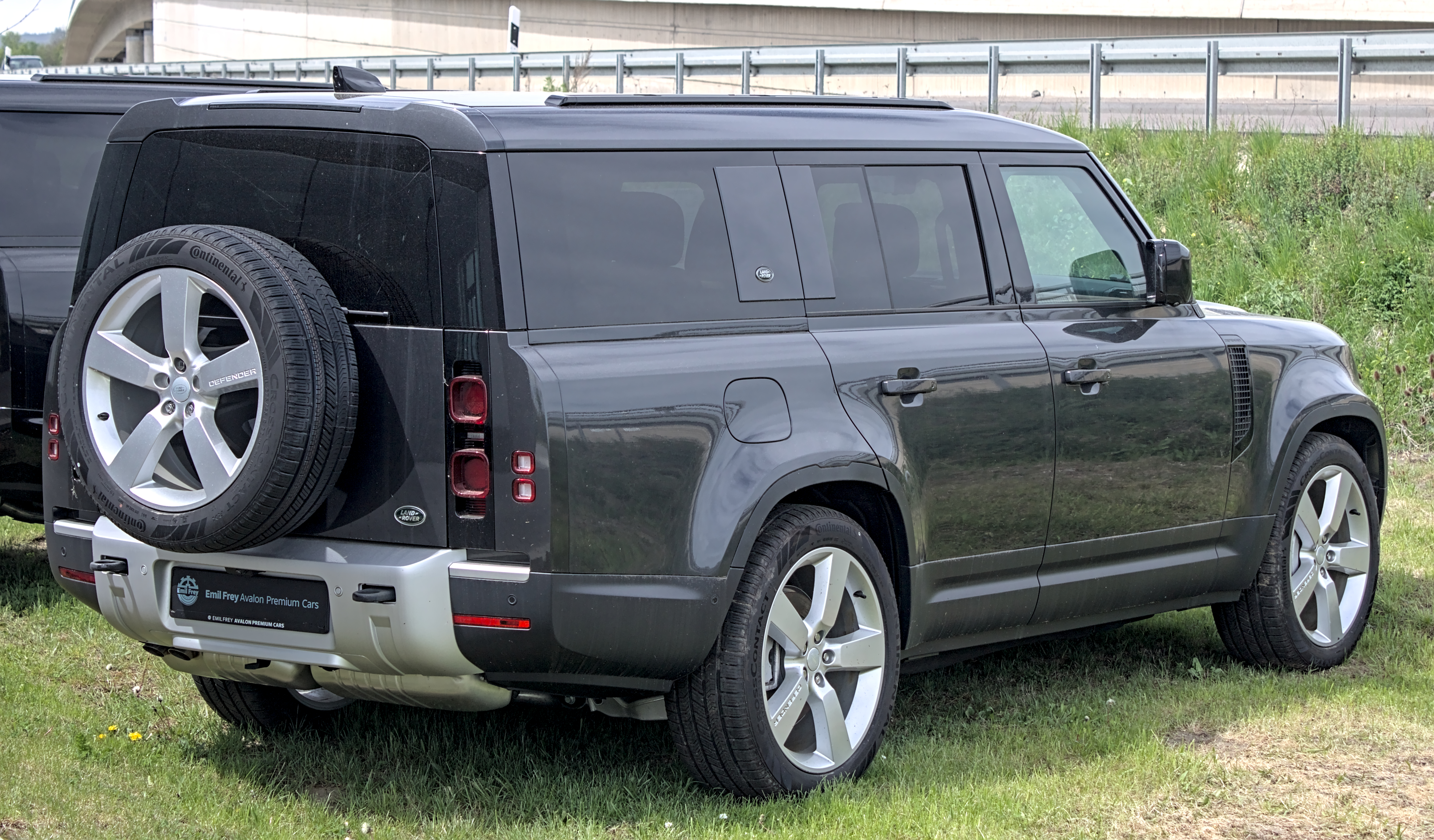
Rear view

The 2020 Defender was unveiled on 10 September 2019 at the 2019 Frankfurt Motor Show in Germany. This is the first all-new update for the Defender since 1983. The 2020 Defender has been engineered to comply with global car regulations and is expected to be sold in 128 territories, including the world's two largest car markets; China and the United States. As sales pick up for the Defender, the latest L663 generation was spotted running tests in Malaysia, signifying a local launch taking place soon. Fast forward to October 2021, the Malaysian-debut of the L663 Land Rover Defender has taken place.

The L663 Defender is available in either '90' three-door or '110' five-door guises, and an eight-seater version of the 110 named the '130'.

Further development of the L663 took place with the official announcement in July 2024 of a newly engineered model OCTA, featuring a 4.4‑litre Twin Turbo mild‑hybrid V8.

== Export and foreign-built versions ==
=== North American Specification (NAS) Defenders ===
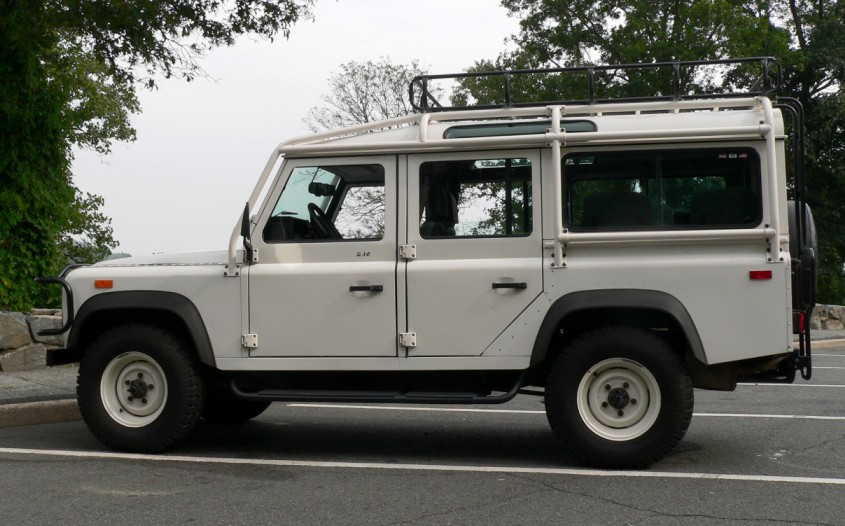
1993 NAS Defender 110

In 1993, Land Rover launched the Defender in the North American (i.e. the United States and Canada) market. Although the Range Rover had been sold there since 1987, this was the first time utility Land Rovers had been sold since 1974. To comply with the strict United States Department of Transportation regulations, ranging from crash safety to lighting, as well as the very different requirements of American buyers, the North American Specification (NAS) Defenders were extensively modified. The initial export batch was 525 Defender 110 County 4x4s: 500 to the United States and 25 to Canada. They were fitted with the 3.9-litre V8 petrol engine, LT-77 five-speed manual transmission and LT230 transfer case. All of the vehicles were "Alpine" white (except one specifically painted black for Ralph Lauren). They sported full external roll-cages and larger side-indicator and tail-lights. All were equipped with the factory-fitted air conditioning system.

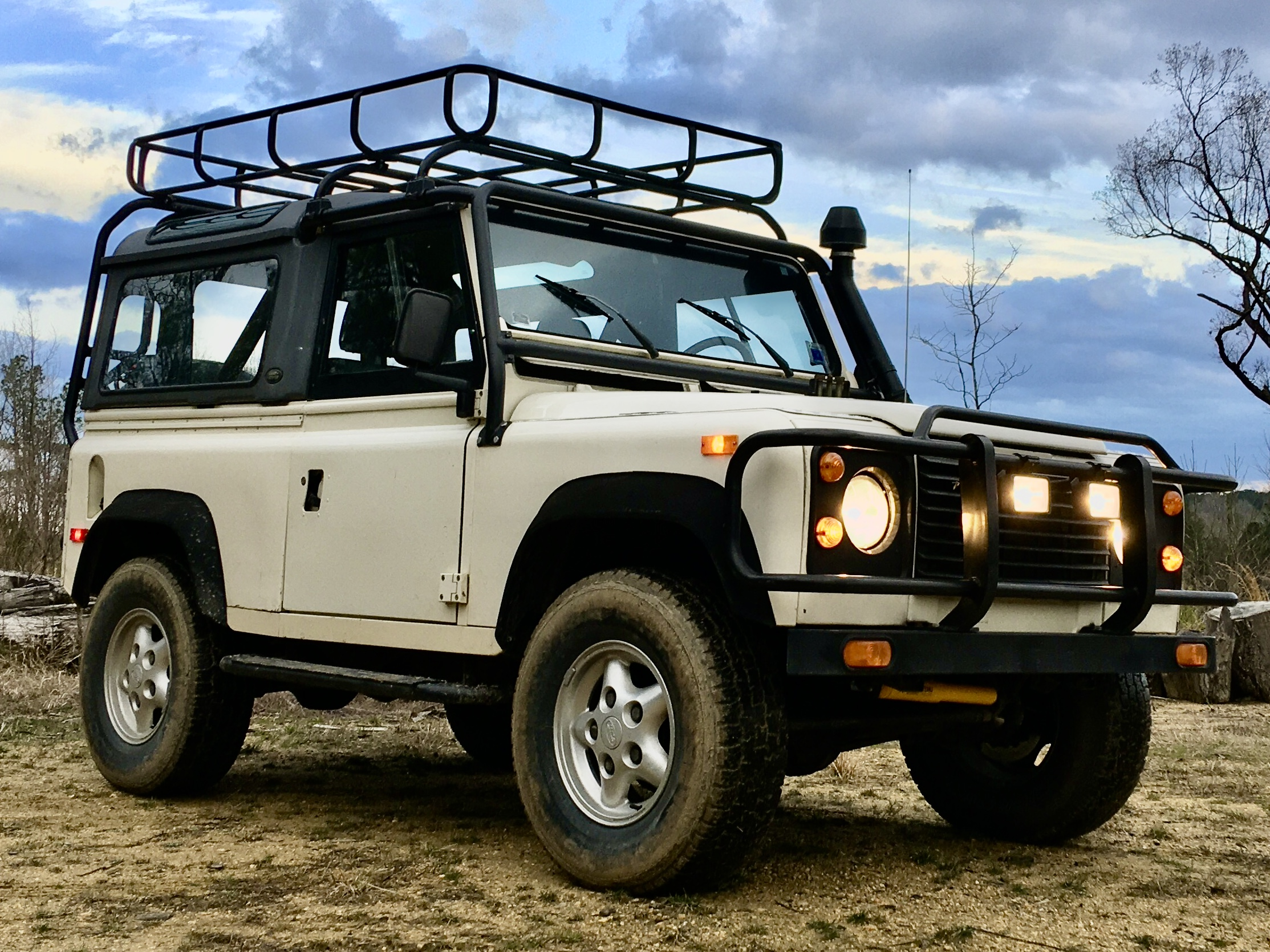
1994 NAS Defender 90

For the 1994 and 1995 model year Land Rover only offered the Defender 90, fitted with a 3.9-litre V8 engine and the R-380 manual transmission which was clearly intended as an upmarket alternative to the Jeep Wrangler. Initially, the Defender 90 was only available as a soft-top with a structural roll cage, but a later version was offered with a unique, removable, fibre-glass roof panel or a regular 4x4 hard-top designated as the estate model.

The NAS Defender 90 soft top model was essentially a 90SV special edition fitted with the petrol V8 engine from the Range Rover instead of the diesel 200TDi since that engine was already certified for US emissions. Among other changes required for the North American market, Land Rover locally sourced new external lights from Rubbolite and Perei that are commonly used on trailers.

In 1997, the final year of US Defender 90 production, the engine was improved, designated 4.0 and mated to a four-speed automatic transmission. In 1998, regulations changed to require the fitting of airbags for both front seat passengers in all vehicles, as well as side door impact requirements. The Defender could not be fitted with these without major modifications, which were not economically viable given the small numbers of NAS vehicles sold in relation to Land Rover's global sales. Land Rover retired its North American Specification utility vehicles at the end of 1997 to focus on its more profitable, popular and upmarket Discovery and Range Rover models, as well as the then newly launched Freelander.

In 2020, Land Rover brought back the Land Rover Defender only as the 4 door model with 2.0 or 3.0 engine and standard hardtop and automatic transmission. It then brought back the 2-door Defender 90 model for the 2021 model year.

=== Land Rover 110 in Australia ===
Continuing on from production of the Australian SIII Stage 1 Isuzu 4BD1 diesel variant, Jaguar Rover Australia (JRA) developed an Isuzu 4BD1 (See List of Isuzu engines) diesel powered 110 for sale as an Australia Only consumer product.

Between 1981 and 1990, the Isuzu 4BD1 engine was the only diesel option available for Land Rover in Australia. All 110 cab chassis Defenders sold in Australia during this time had a wheelbase of 120 inches in order to accommodate an 8 ft x 6 ft tray. A small number of 6x6 cab chassis Defenders were also made by JRA during this time. While the Land Rover has been in use in the Australian military from 1959, as a consumer product from the 1970s, it fell out of favour as a 4x4 work vehicle while offerings from Toyota and Nissan increased in popularity. Mid-2009, Land Rover expanded the model range to include 110 and 130 cab-chassis, panel van and HCPU versions, and late in the year announced the reintroduction of the 90 4x4 model for sale from early 2010.

=== Defender licensees and clones ===
Defenders, derivatives and clones have been built by a number of manufacturers. Most prominent is Santana Motors in Spain, who has built these under licence from Land Rover since 1958. They were built from CKD kits until the licence expired in 1983; Land Rover derivatives (Santana Series IV) were then introduced in 1984 and built until 1994.

Morattab in Iran manufactures it as the "Pazhan", using a Mitsubishi/Hyundai V6 engine, using parts and molds purchased from Santana. Tempo in West Germany, Minerva in Belgium, Otokar in Turkey (beginning in 1987 and continued until the original production ended), and Karmann in Brazil (from 1999 to 2006, using Land Rover CKD kits) have also built Defenders and derivatives.

Via their commercial vehicle arm, Fiat marketed a modified version of the Spanish Santana PS10 ("Aníbal" for the Spanish market). Product as the Iveco Massif between 2007 and 2011, the model was manufactured by the Santana Motor factory in Linares, Spain.

Assembly also occurred in Pakistan, Malaysia and South Africa.

== Special editions ==
=== Land Rover 90SV ===
In 1992 the first special edition Land Rover Defender was produced. Called the 90SV (SV stands for "special vehicles", as all the vehicles were produced by Land Rover's Special Vehicle Operations department), they were painted turquoise and were fitted with a black canvas Tickford soft top with standard door tops. Alloy wheels were also fitted, together with rear disc brakes (a first for a Land Rover). Despite the vehicle's sporty looks, it used the standard 200Tdi turbodiesel engine. Only 90 were made for the UK market.

The development of the 90SV paved the way for the North American Defender 90 soft top. Land Rover contracted with Safety Devices to procure roll cages. For the production vehicles Land Rover added padding to the roll cage from the B pillar to the C pillar using a proprietary method. This roll cage was later equipped to the Defender 90 for North America and is commonly known as the NAS roll cage. The prototype vehicle used for marketing materials did not have padding on the roll cage.

=== Limited Edition (LE) ===
In 1997, the last year that Defender 90's were made available in the US, Land Rover created 300 Special Edition Station Wagons. Known as the Limited Edition (LE) these Land Rover Defender 90's were painted with a unique one year colour known as Willow Green with a contrasting white accented roof; they were also fitted with body protection in the form of 5 large diamond plated sheets and an external safety cage with a full roof rack. The 1997 Land Rover Defender 90 LE also came with the following options as standard equipment: Air conditioning, rear ladder, rear step, twin tube running boards with diamond plate trim, front A bar and a limited edition placard which was affixed to the rear of the car that denoted its build number out of 300.

=== Defender 50th ===
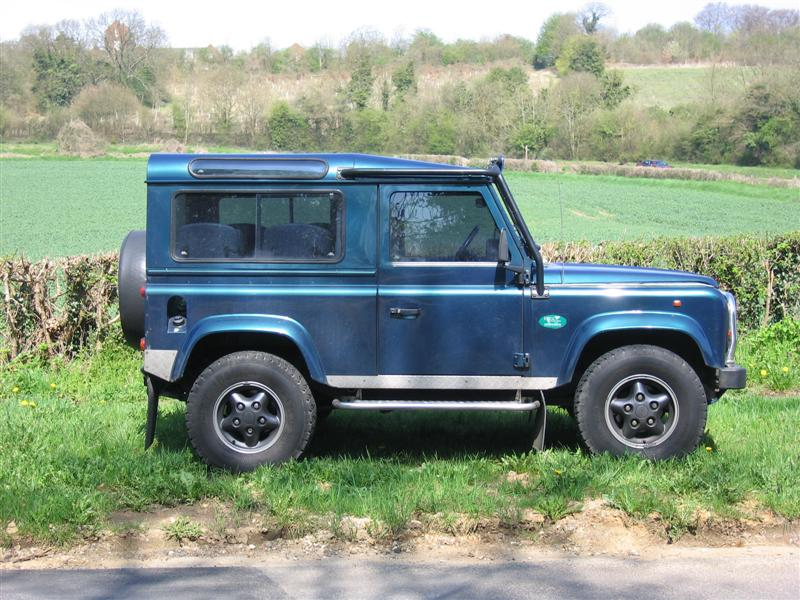
50th anniversary Defender

For Land Rover's 50th anniversary in 1998 two special editions were built. The first was the Defender 50th which was essentially a NAS (North American spec) Defender 90. It was powered by a 190 hp (140 kW) 4.0-litre V8 petrol engine and was the first Defender outside North America to be fitted with an automatic transmission. Air conditioning made them very comfortable vehicles. For the UK and Europe they were painted Atlantis blue, a dark green-blue flip-flop colour, and had a Safety Devices roll-over protection cage for the front seat occupants. In total 1071 50th anniversary Defenders were built; 385 for the UK home market, the rest for Japan, Europe and the Middle East.

Land Rover South Africa also built 26 50th Anniversary edition 90s featuring the BMW M52 engine. The vehicles were painted Santorini Blue with special decal graphics on the sides. They also featured "colour-coded wheel arch mouldings, spot lamps, spare wheel carrier, free style alloy wheels, stainless steel A-frame Bullbar, two-tone solid paint, Willards welding and side runners" as well as "leather seats, radio and CD player, leather steering wheel and gear lever as well as a cooler box." Each was randomly numbered between 1 and 50, as 24 50th Anniversary edition 110s were also built, but with a 300Tdi diesel engine. The 50th Anniversary 110 was called "Safari" and was painted in a limestone green colour. It featured everything included on the 50th Anniversary 90 with the addition of "a roof rack and step ladder, as well as a wrap-around Bullbar in place of the A-frame" and "special cloth seats are used in favour of the leather ones. It is also fitted with a GPS (Pathfinder system)."

=== Heritage ===
The second 1998 special edition was the "Heritage", intended to hark back to the early days of Land Rover in the 1940s. Available in 90 or 110 variants, the Heritage was only available in the two original colours offered by the company: the dark bronze green and the light pastel Atlantic green. A metal mesh-effect front grille, body-coloured alloy wheels and wing mirrors and silver-painted door and windscreen hinges were all employed to make the Heritage look similar to the original Series I of 1948. Inside, special instruments were used, with black-on-beige displays. The powertrain was the standard Td5 diesel engine and 5 speed manual transmission.

=== Tomb Raider ===
Tomb Raider 90 special edition

Possibly the best known special edition was the "Tomb Raider" of 2000, built to commemorate Land Rover's role in the first film of that franchise. The Tomb Raider was designed to look like an off-road expedition vehicle. Painted dark metallic grey with special badging and details, the Tomb Raider came equipped with a roof rack and roof rack support system (looking similar to a roll-cage), additional spot lights, winch, bull-bar and raised air-intake. They were available either as a 90 or a 110 double cab, with standard Td5 engines. The actual Defender used in the film (now on display at the Motor Heritage Centre, Gaydon) was a highly modified 110 HCPU with a specially fitted and tuned V8 petrol engine and a non-standard interior.

=== G4 Edition ===
Following the first Land Rover G4 Challenge in 2003, G4-Edition Defenders became available. As well as the distinctive Tangiers orange colour of the competition vehicles, yellow, silver and black versions were also produced. Defender 90 and 110 4x4 versions were available, with front A-bar, roll-cage, side-steps and front spotlights as standard, as well as G4 badging.

=== Defender Black ===
The 2002 Defender Black Limited Edition was produced in 2 variants based on the XS trim level: 90 Station Wagon or a 110 Double Cab Pickup with Java black micatallic paint, ABS & Electronic Traction Control, chequerplate wing top and sill protection, side protection rails (aka XS steps) front roll cage (aka screen protection bar), Boost alloy wheels, a "NAS" rear step / towbar and green tinted windows. The interior has black leather seats, chrome bezel instrument pack, black leather trimmed steering wheel, black carpet & trim, black leather-trimmed cubby box & lid, billet aluminium controls & gear knobs, air conditioning, electric front windows and remote central door locking. Both models used the Td5 engine.

The on-the-road UK prices were £24995 for either model. 92 examples of the 90 were made, and 144 the 110 DCPU. As of 2018, 76 and 103 respectively remained registered in the UK

=== Defender Silver ===
The Defender Silver was available in three distinct versions: TD5, 90 and 110 Station Wagon and 110 Double Cab Pickup. Every Defender Silver was fitted with an A-frame protection bar which offered additional protection to the front of the vehicle. Lamp guards were fitted front and rear, and a tow pack incorporating an electrics kit not only to power trailer lights, but also additional equipment. The underside was further shielded from harm by the sump guard and air-con and ABS/TC were available as options. The vehicles came of the production line and were then modified by SVO, Special Vehicle Operations. They are comparatively rare, especially the Double Cab Pick Up with the Fiberglass TruckMan Top.

=== X-Tech ===
The 1999 X-Tech was aimed at the commercial market, being a metallic silver 90 hard top fitted with County-style seats, alloy wheels and Alpine window lights. The second model year edition in 2003 was better equipped with wing protector plates and air conditioning.

=== Defender SVX ===
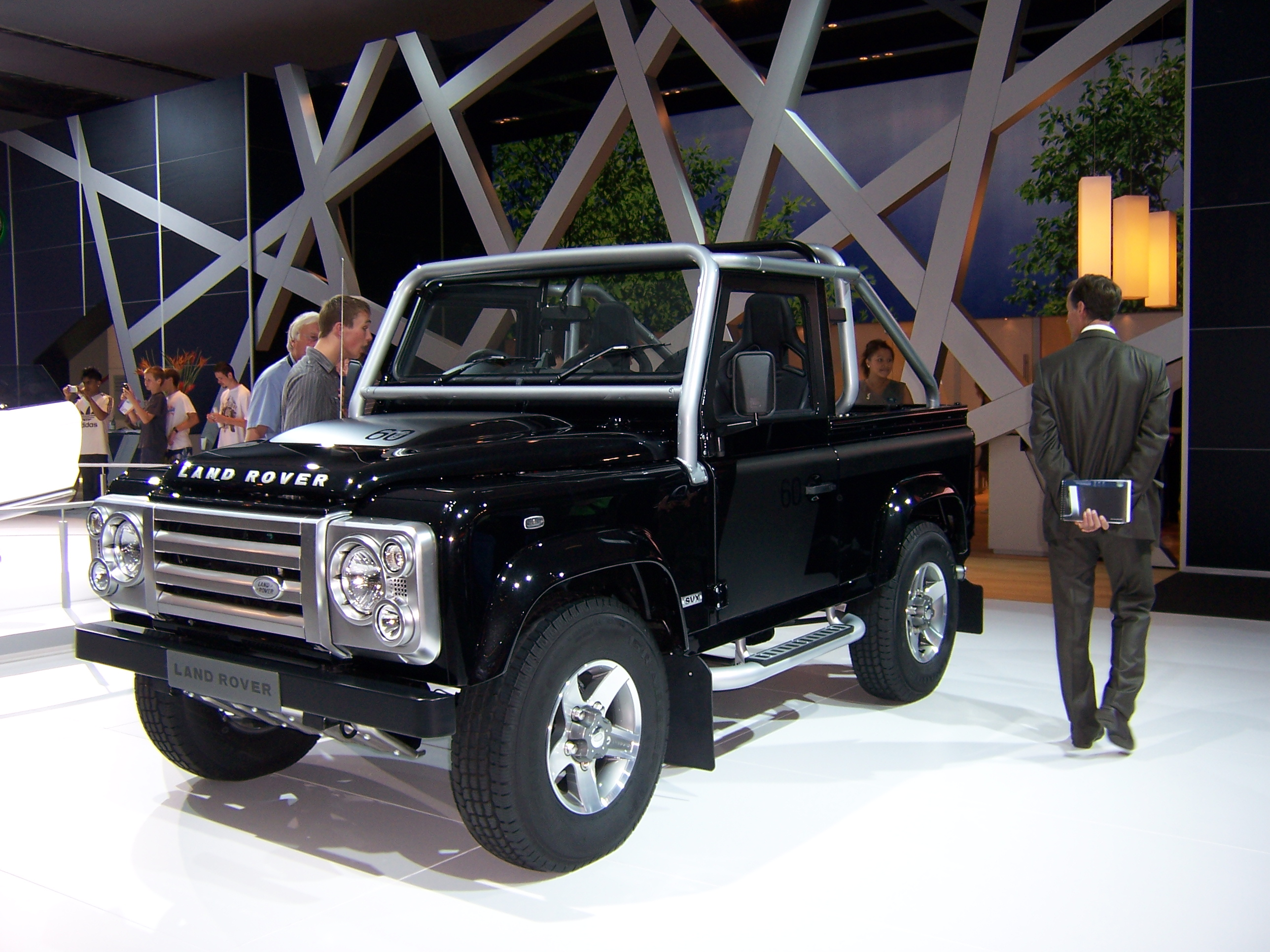
Defender SVX

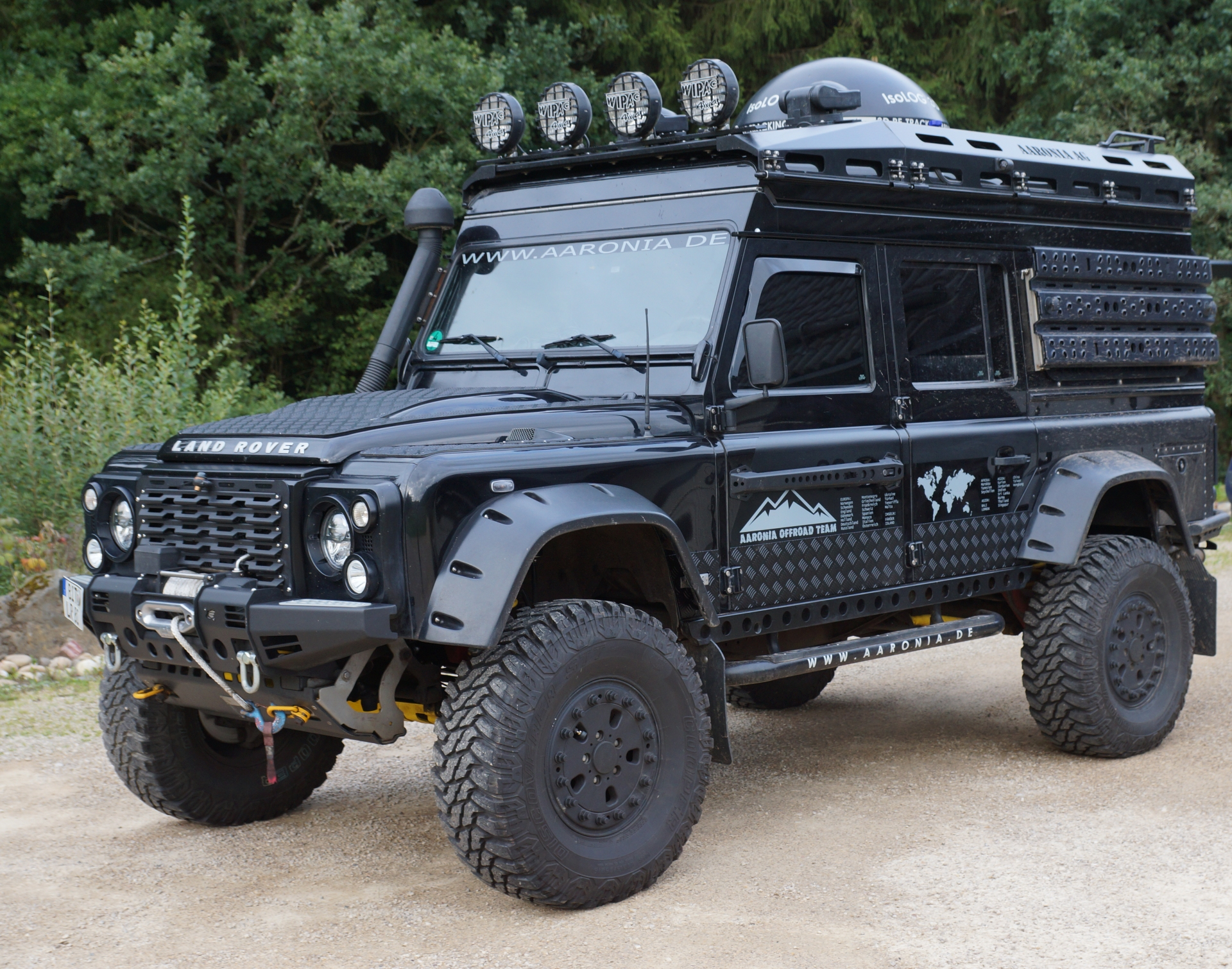
Defender SVX 110 with portal axles

2008 saw Land Rover's 60th anniversary, for which a new series of special edition Defenders were produced. Branded the "SVX", three models were built. All were painted black with "satin" effect body graphics on the vehicles' sides and bonnet carrying the "60th" logo used throughout 2008 at various special events and on anniversary merchandise. Bespoke five-spoke alloy wheels were used and a new silver-coloured front grille design was used. This also incorporated a new design of headlamp with the sidelight lamp being integral with the main headlamp unit, allowing the space previously used for the separate sidelight to be used to fit a pair of high-intensity driving lamps. Inside the SVX models gained Recaro bucket seats in the front row, alloy gearlever knobs and a Garmin GPS navigation system. The drivetrain was the standard 2.4-litre diesel and six-speed manual permanent four-wheel-drive transmission. The SVX edition was available as a 110 (only available outside the UK), a 90 and a brand-new design of 90 soft top- the first time a soft-top model had been available through showrooms in the UK since 1992. SVX soft tops had only the two front seats- the rear load bay being used to accommodate the spare wheel and a lockable storage box. A new design of hood was used, sloping down towards the rear over a jointed folding frame, unlike the standard square-framed hood used on other soft top Land Rovers. (This unit comes with a 2.4-litre diesel Ford DuraTorq 4 cylinder engine).

=== Bespoke Paul Smith Defender ===
To mark the end of production, Land Rover asked British fashion designer Paul Smith to produce a one-off version of the Defender, which was launched in May 2015. The car's exterior featured 27 different colours on the exterior inspired by the Defender's long life in service with the Army, Navy and Air Force as well as fire, coastguard and mountain rescue roles but also by the colours of the British countryside where Defenders have long since become part of the landscape.

=== 2018 Defender Works V8 70th Anniversary Edition ===
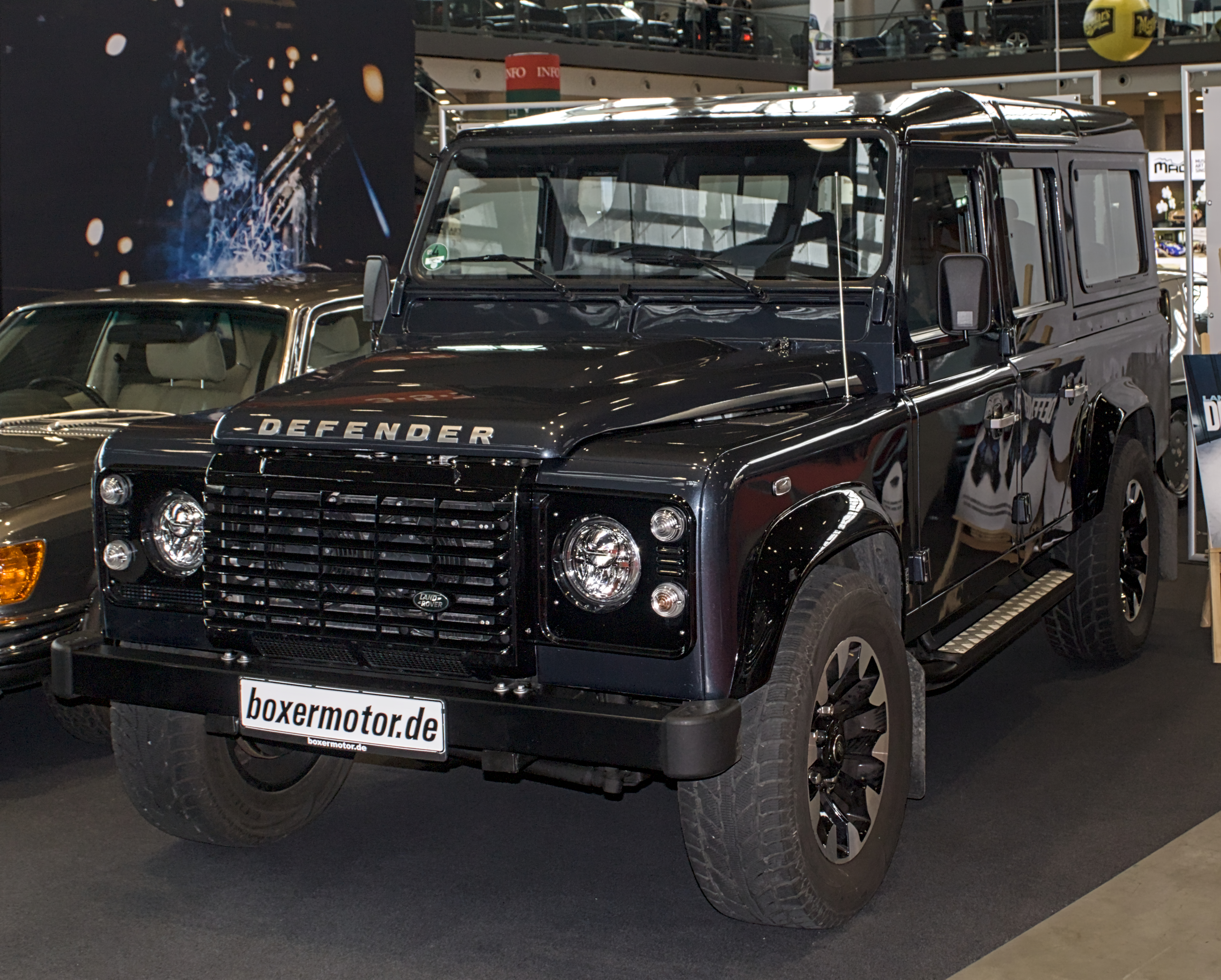
Defender Works V8 70th Anniversary Edition

In January 2018, Land Rover unveiled the Defender Works V8 as part of the Defender's 70th Anniversary. The 150 examples feature a naturally-aspirated 5.0-litre Jaguar AJ-V8 engine producing 405 hp (302 kW) and 515 Nm, mated to an 8-speed ZF 8HP automatic gearbox. Land Rover additionally fitted new springs, dampers and anti-roll bars and uprated brakes along with 18" alloy wheels and all-terrain tyres. The 70th Anniversary Defenders were "restomods" produced by Land Rover Classic division and not a new production model. They were late-model, pre-registered Defenders that were carefully selected based on age, mileage, and condition. They were built in both 90 and 110 wheelbases, with a starting price of £150,000.

=== Other special editions ===
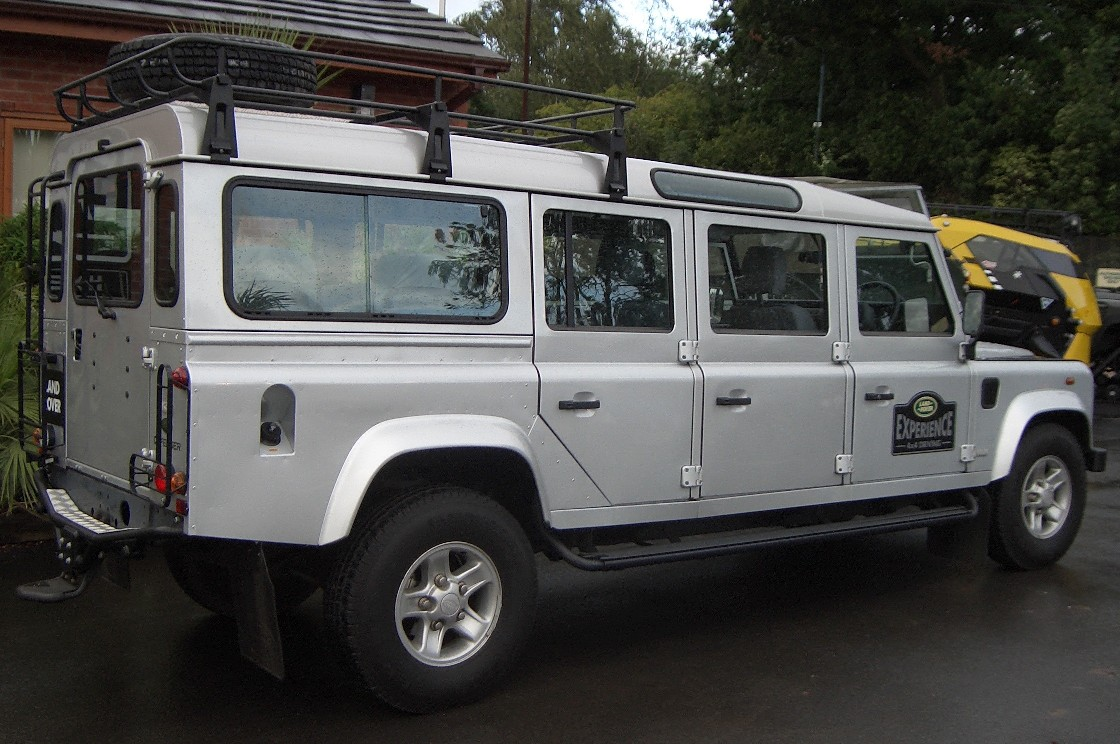
Land Rover South Africa built Defender 147 "Stretch".

There have also been various special editions of the Defender created by the company's overseas operations for sale in their specific markets such as the "Sahara" edition and 55th anniversary Defender 90s sold in France; the former being a basic-spec model painted in a sand-like tan colour and supplied with special decals and the latter being a 4x4 fitted with numerous luxury options and special badges in the mould of the factory-built 50th editions. Sometimes individual Land Rover dealers have created limited editions of vehicles to suit their markets. A dealer in Scotland created the "Braemar" edition of 25 vehicles to appeal to local agricultural and forestry buyers, being a 90 hard top supplied ready fitted with a winch, off-road tyres, spotlamps and worklamps, underbody protection and chequer plate.

Land Rover South Africa built the Land Rover 147, a stretched 7 door estate. The 147 is stretched by 37 inches allowing for an extra door and two seats with a total seating capacity of 11 people.

A specially-commissioned custom-built modified Land Rover Defender TD 130, painted in Edinburgh Green, was used as a hearse for Prince Philip, Duke of Edinburgh, designed by the Duke himself, at his funeral at Windsor Castle. The Defender Hearse had an open-topped rear to hold the coffin.

== Military Defenders ==
=== British and other armies ===
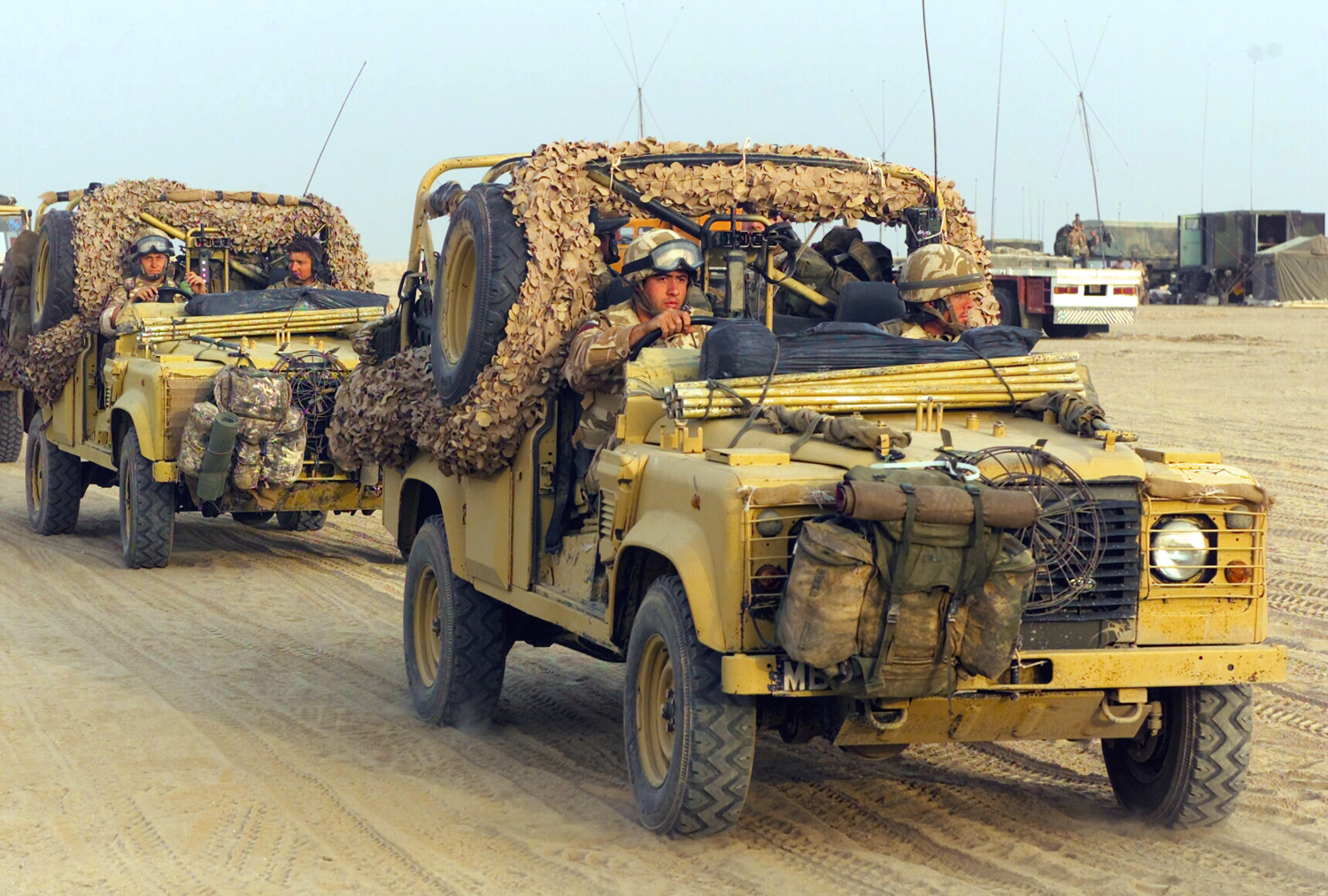
Defender 110 patrol vehicles 'Wolf'

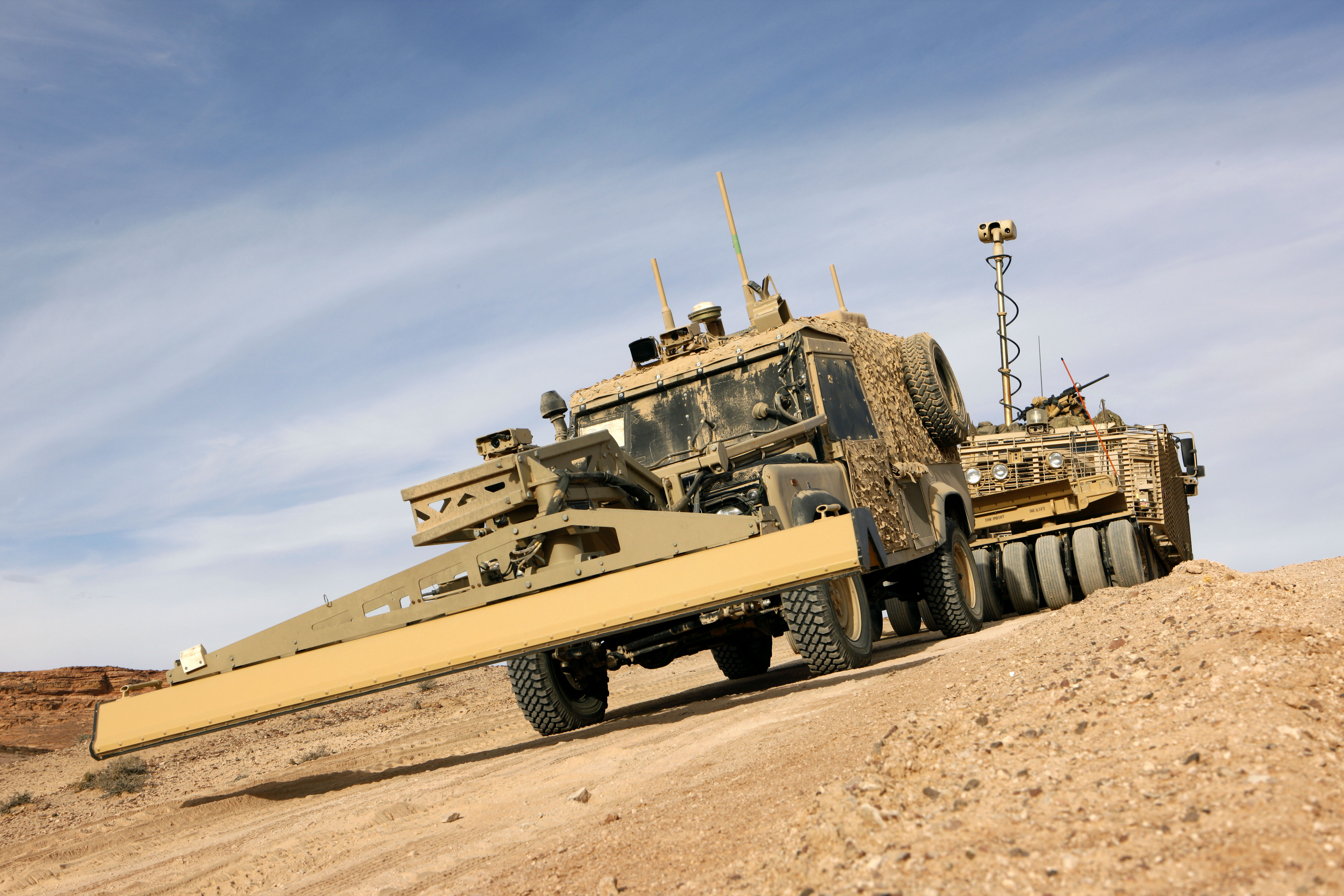
Remote-control "Panama" Defender with ground-penetrating radar to find IEDs for the British Army

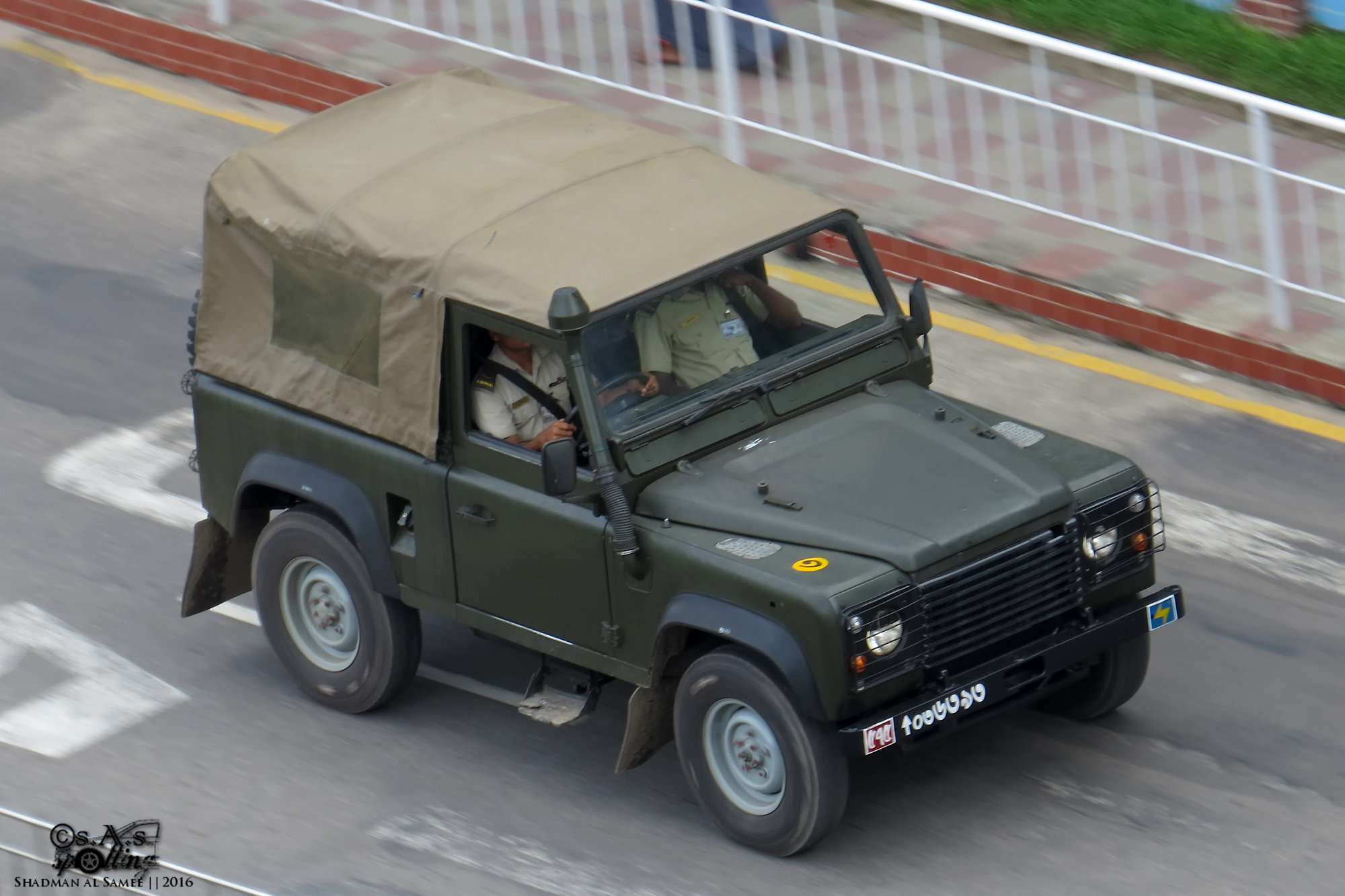
Bangladesh Army Land Rover Defender

Land Rover Santana 88 of the Spanish Army

Land Rover Defender vehicles have been used by many of the world's military forces as military light utility vehicle, including the US in some limited capacity, following experience with the vehicle during the first Gulf War, where US forces found the British Army's vehicles to be more capable and better suited to operation in urban areas and for air-lifting than the Humvee. (See U.S. Army Ranger Special Operations Vehicle.) The British Army has used Land Rovers since the 1950s, as have many countries in the Commonwealth of Nations. The British Army replaced its Series III fleet with One Tens in 1985, with a smaller fleet of Nineties following in 1986. Both used the 2.5-litre naturally aspirated diesel engine. These older vehicles are reaching the end of their service lives, with many being sold onto the civilian market from the late 1990s.

In 1994 Land Rover created the Defender XD (XD= extra duty) to replace and complement these vehicles. Powered by 300Tdi engines, the XD has a much stronger chassis, with fibre webbing around the welded joints in the chassis and around stress points to massively increase load capacity. The XD was available both in Defender 90 and 110 forms and is known to the British Army as the Land Rover Wolf. Usually 110-inch (2,794 mm) soft or hard tops, they are used for patrol, communications and supply duties. 90XDs are less common, but are generally ordered as soft top or hard top vehicles for light liaison and communications. Short-wheelbase vehicles lack the load capacity needed by modern armies, and the increased power of heavy-lift helicopters has made the larger 110s easily air-transportable- a historic advantage of the smaller, lighter 90.

Land Rover offered its "core" military Defenders with the 300Tdi engine rather than the more powerful but more complicated Td5 engine offered in civilian vehicles. The 300 Tdi Defender went into service in the "Green Fleet" from 1998. Before the 300Tdi engine was introduced, military Land Rovers were offered with 2.5-litre petrol and diesel engines, as well as the 3.5-litre V8 petrol. Trials with the Td5 engine proved it to be reliable in battlefield conditions. However, initially it was decided that servicing and repairing its electronic control systems should they fail was too complicated and reliant on having diagnostic computers available. Land Rover were also unable to guarantee they could make the Td5 resistant to the electromagnetic pulse (EMP) generated by a nuclear weapon.

However, following successful trials by the Australian Defence Force of the TD5 Landrover, the British MOD purchased a small fleet of TD5 Landrover Defender 110s for its "Green Fleet" between 2000 and 2002. These were specially converted for the MOD by Landrover Specialist Vehicles. They were plated with UK military registration plates and painted IRR green. Most of these vehicles were deployed in the Falklands as troop carriers and communications vehicles for use by the Royal Marines and UK Special Forces. A small number of TD5 Defender 110s were also ordered for the Royal Navy. These were painted navy blue and deployed to the Falklands. Of these Royal Navy vehicles a few were later re-painted IRR green and reassigned to Royal Marines and SBS use. The more powerful TD5 engine, which was capable of being re-mapped up to around 200 Bhp was ideally suited to the rugged terrain of the Falklands and for towing trailers. The majority of these Falkland vehicles were sold off to Military Motors Ltd by the MOD in 2013. The troop carriers had eight passenger seats in the rear and two rear side windows each side for extra visibility. Visually, these UK military troop carrier TD5 Defenders looked similar to the ones used by the Australian Defence Force except that the UK ones were plain IRR green.

The Albanian Land Force also possesses a large fleet of Land Rover Defenders, a quantity of them were given by the Turkish and Italian armies and the rest of the fleet were bought.

The Italian Army adopted the Defender 90 in 1991 under the name of "AR 90" (AR standing for "Autovettura da Ricognizione", Reconnaissance Vehicle), soft top version, with 2.0 petrol engines MPI series, 2.5 diesel Td5 and 2.4 diesel Td4 engines. Another Land Force version is denominated "VAV" (standing vor "Veicolo d'Attacco Veloce", Fast Attack Vehicle), carrying a crew of three and armed with NATO 5.56 machine gun and 40 mm grenade launcher. The Defender hard top version in Italy is also adopted by police forces Carabinieri (Defender 90), civil protection forces (Defender 90, 110 and 130), fire fighting squads (Defender 90, 110).

With 300Tdi production stopping in 2006, Land Rover set up production of a military version of the four-cylinder Ford Duratorq engine that is also used as a replacement for the Td5 in civilian vehicles.

The British Army's Land Rovers have been the subject of criticism following recent operations in Iraq and Afghanistan. The majority of British military Land Rovers carry no armour-plating and the composite-armoured Snatch Land Rover (originally designed to withstand small arms fire and hand-thrown projectiles as experienced in Northern Ireland) is vulnerable to roadside bomb and rocket attacks.

Several Armoured personnel carrier versions of the Defender exist. Among them are the series 5 of the Shorland armoured car, the MDT David, the VBL Gladiador, and the Canadian INKAS Superior.

=== Australian Army ===
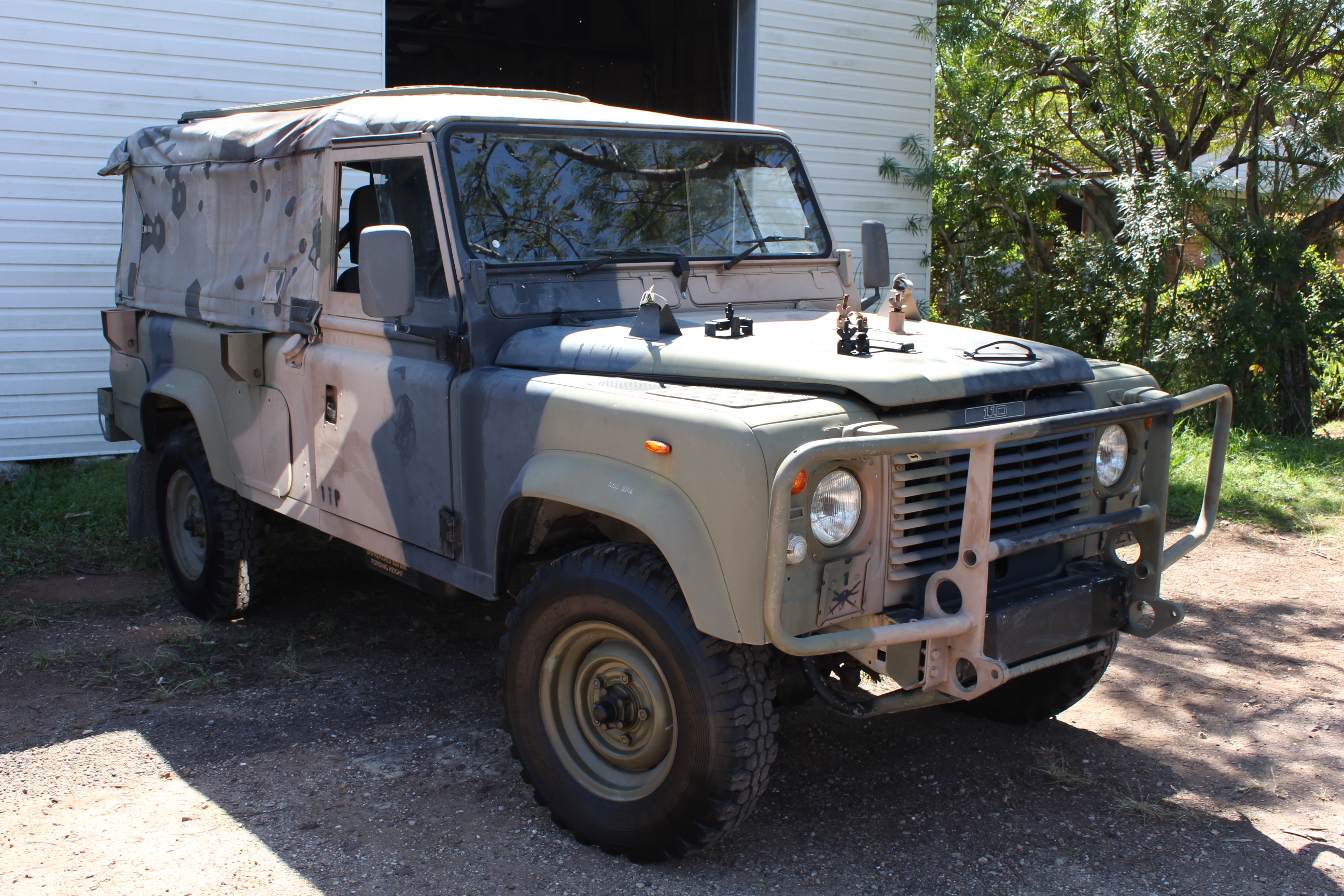
1989 Ex-Australian Army Land Rover "Perentie" 110.

The Land Rover Perentie is the Land Rover 110 produced for the Australian Defence Force (ADF).

In the 1980s, using the Australia Only civilian 4BD1 powered 110 as a basis, Jaguar Rover Australia (JRA) developed a military version of the 4BD1 110 model for competitive trials against vehicles supplied by Chrysler JEEP, Mercedes and Toyota conducted by the Australian Army Testing Establishment. Land Rover was the successful candidate and the Australian Army ordered several thousand 110 Land Rovers in various configurations made to this specification, called the Land Rover Perentie, some of which were 6x6 drive. Six wheel drive Perenties were fitted with a turbocharged 3.9L Isuzu diesel engine (4BD1-T), while the 4x4 versions were powered by the naturally aspirated variant (4BD1). The Australian Army vehicles were assembled at the Jaguar Rover Australia (JRA) facility at Moorebank, NSW, from locally made components and other components from the UK and Japan.

== Police and government vehicles ==
=== United Kingdom ===
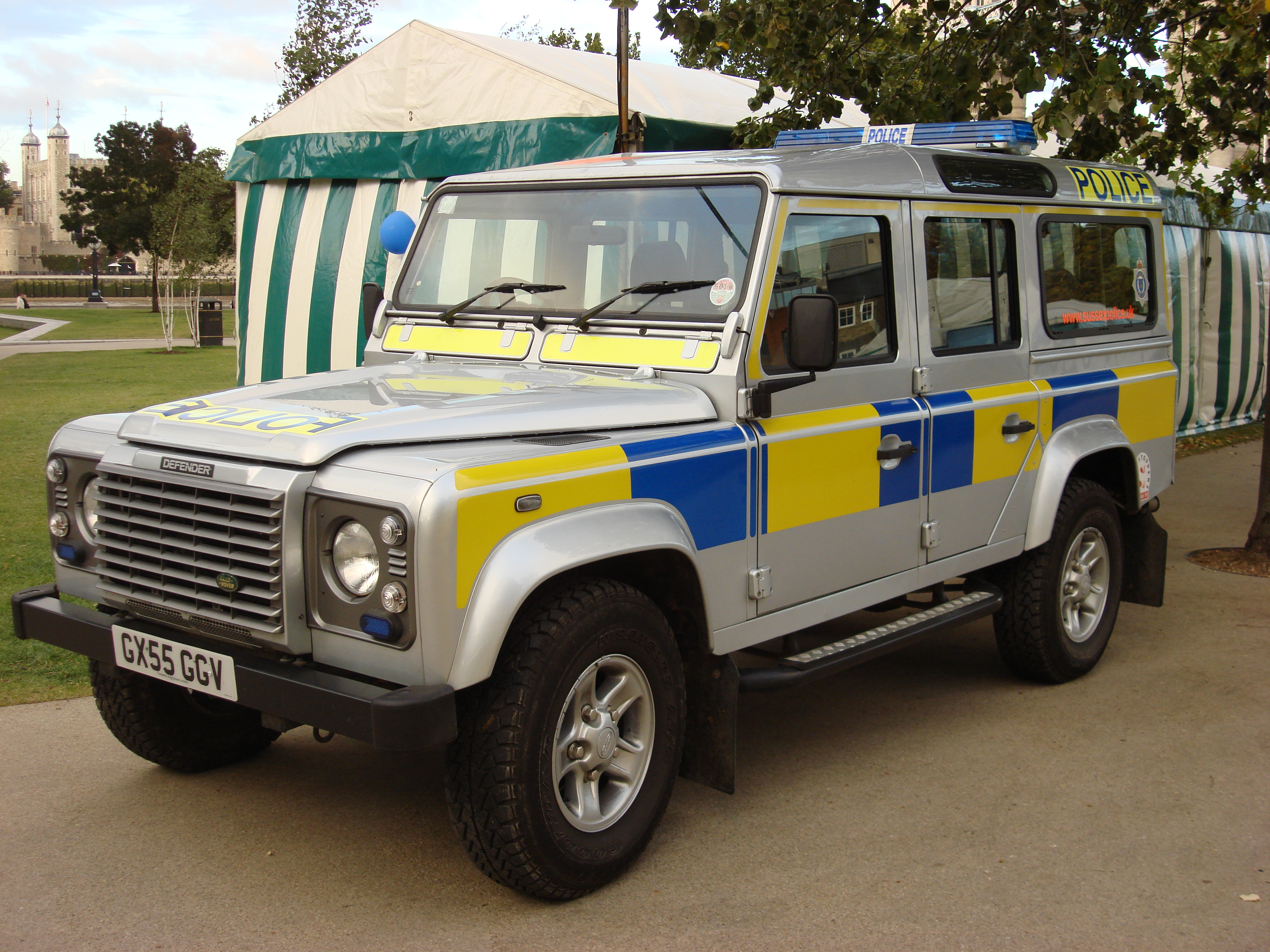
Sussex police Land Rover

The British police have used Land Rovers (including the Defender) in their service for many years, they are supplied with the entire range from Land Rover itself. Due to the ongoing terrorist threat and proliferation of public order disturbances, the Police Service of Northern Ireland has employed armoured and hardened versions of the Land Rover Defender for over 40 years in various guises. The current PSNI armoured public order vehicle is based upon a heavy duty Defender 110 chassis which starts life as a chassis cab and which is then stripped of the original body and fitted with upgraded suspension, brakes, and drive train. The bonnet, wings and roof are produced from armoured composite materials whilst the body is manufactured from a range of armoured steel and composite materials and is known as the "Pangolin".

=== Germany ===
In 2004 a fleet of 12 long wheelbase 110 Td5 Land Rovers were produced for the federal German government, varying between 110 vans, 110 HCPUs and 110 4x4s. The German government did not renew the supply contract after 2006, instead turning to Mercedes for their logistics fleet.

Vehicles produced for the German government order were produced in metallic grey with white roofs. The electrical installation on these vehicles was a special order and kept "luxury" fittings and fixtures to a bare minimum. Four FFR equipped vehicles were produced to facilitate the VHF radios in service at that time with the German government and police authorities. Following the change-over to the Mercedes contract, the federal German government sold their Td5 fleet.

== See also ==
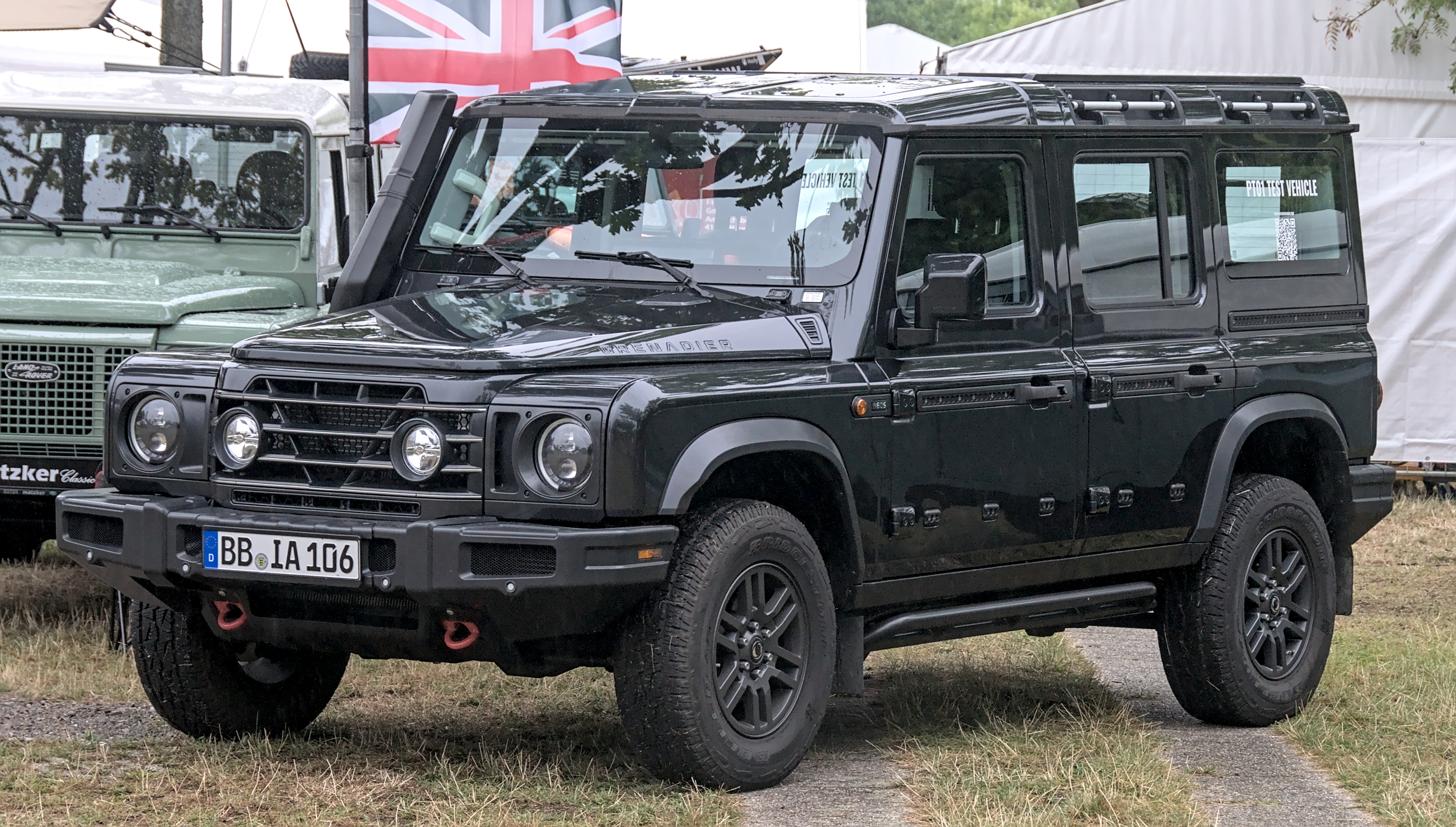
Ineos Grenadier

- Ineos Grenadier, an offroader inspired by the original Defender.
- MDT David
- Ranger Special Operations Vehicle
