= VBL (inbrafiltro) =

VBL Gladiador
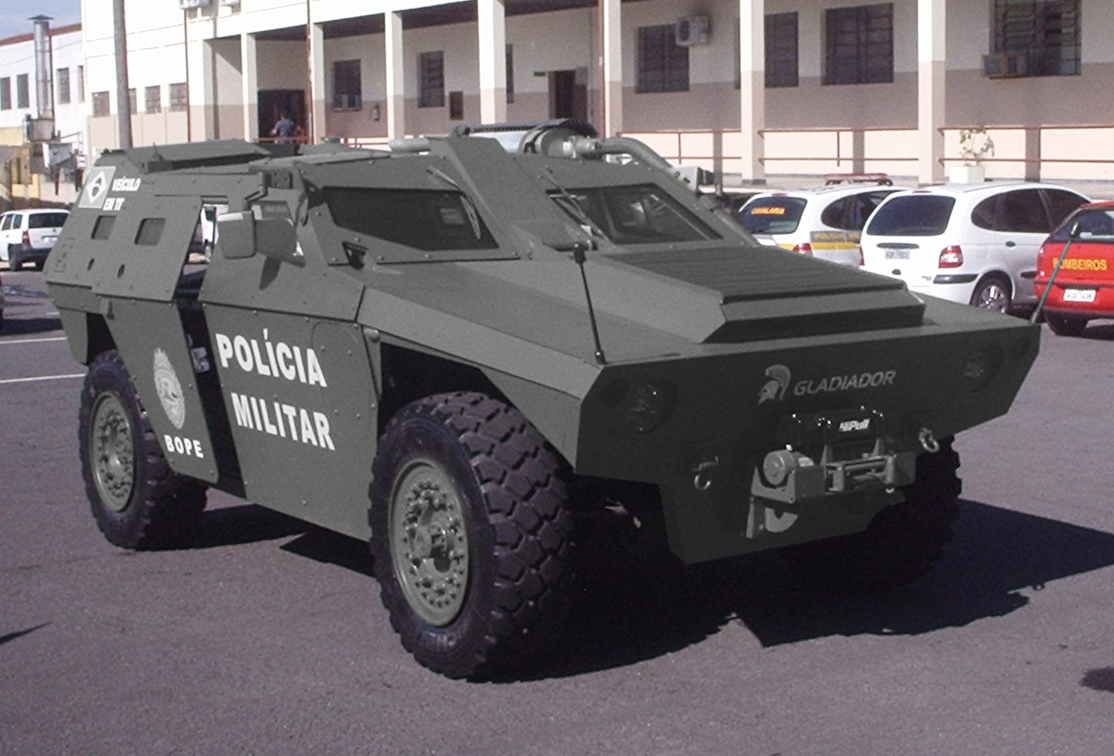
- Gladiador I
- Type: Wheeled all-terrain vehicle
- Place of origin: Brazil

Production history
- Designed: 2002
- Manufacturer: Grupo Inbra

Specifications
- Mass: 3.5t
- Length: 3.80 m (4.00 m long version)
- Width: 2.02 m
- Height: 1.70 m
- Crew: 2-3 (Gladiiador I), 5 (Gladiador II)
- Armour: STANAG level 1 (protection against 7.62×51 NATO rounds and shrapnel); level 2 (Gladiador II)
- Main armament: depends on the version
- Engine: Engine 2.5 liter TDI diesel with intercooler, of 115CV the 3.800rpm, with torque of 29.0 mkgf 1.600rp hp ( kW)
- Power/weight: hp/t
- Suspension: 0.35 m ground clearance
- Operational range: 640 km (can be extended to 1000 km with external gas tanks)
- Maximum speed: 120 km/h

The Light Armored Vehicle (VBL) - Group project Inbrafiltro - is a 4x4 military vehicle designed by Brazilian security company Grupo Inbrafiltro for military and police adoption.

Based on the Land Rover Defender, it was designed to fulfill the Brazilian Army requirements for protection and mobility, but was never adopted by the military.

== History ==
The VBL was first revealed in 2002, when its first iteration was presented at the SAE 2002 congress. In 2008, an updated VBL was unveiled, drawing the attention of Brazilian police forces. At LAAD 2009, Inbrafiltro presented a mockup called BLSR (veículo leve sobre rodas, light wheeled vehicle), and at LAAD 2011, it received the name VBL "Gladiator". In the same year, the Military Police of Paraná State received a model for testing.

In partnership with Agrale, an updated VBL participated in the VMBT-LR competition by Brazilian Army to acquire a new 4x4 vehicle (that eventually led to the acquisition of the Iveco LMV) in mind.

Produced within the premises of Inbrafiltro, the VBL, the 3.5 ton class has the monobloc built in ballistic steel plate and is equipped with a shield against 7.62 NATO ammunition. As a modification of the Land Rover Defender, the vehicle is designed to have good operational mobility, and can be equipped with different types of equipment, depending on the configuration required by the customer.

The model was designed to have an autonomy of 640 km of highway and 400 in rough terrain, without a trailer and without using additional fuel tanks. The maximum load is around 1600 pounds, capable of transporting the driver and five soldiers.

The VBL had the capacity for chemical, biological or radiological defence and low thermal signature, radar and noise. Another feature includes nocturnal mobility and ability to be transported airbone by the C-130 aircraft used by the Brazilian air force. The car has six smoke grenades launchers arranged on the sides of the vehicle.

At LAAD 2015, the company presented an updated version called Gladiator II, with STANAG level 2 armor and able to use remotelly controlled weapons such as the REMAX 3. Of the 24 million Reais involved in the development of the Gladiador II, 19 million came from Finep.

Its first customer was the Military Police of Rondônia, with the first unit being delivered in 2021.

== Operators ==
- Brazil:
  - Military Police of Paraná State: At least one unit for testing.
  - Military Police of Rondônia State: At least one Gladiador II
