= VBI =

VBI may refer to:

- Biocomplexity Institute of Virginia Tech (formerly the Virginia Bioinformatics Institute), a research organization specializing in bioinformatics, computational biology, and systems biology in Virginia, United States
- Value-based investing, also known as value investing, an investment paradigm that involves buying securities that appear underpriced by some form of fundamental analysis
- VBI Vaccines Inc. and Variation Biotechnologies, related manufacturers of vaccines
- Victory Bible Institute, a Christian academy headquartered in Tulsa
- Vertebrobasilar insufficiency, a temporary set of symptoms due to decreased blood flow (ischemia) in the posterior circulation of the brain
- Vertical blank interrupt, a hardware feature found in some computer systems that generate a video display
- vertical blanking interval, a portion of a television signal
- Visible Broadband Imager, part of the Daniel K. Inouye Solar Telescope
