= Land Rover Llama =

Vehicle by Land Rover

The Land Rover Llama is a vehicle that was designed and developed by the British company Land Rover in the mid-1980s. 11 prototypes and a single production vehicle were built during 1986/7 with the hope of winning a contract from the Ministry of Defence (MoD) to replace its existing fleet of Land Rover 101 gun tractors. Heavily based on the contemporary Land Rover One Ten, the Llama was intended to be sold on both the military and civilian markets. However, the MoD did not choose Land Rover's design and without the security of these sales Land Rover was unwilling to risk putting the Llama on the market.

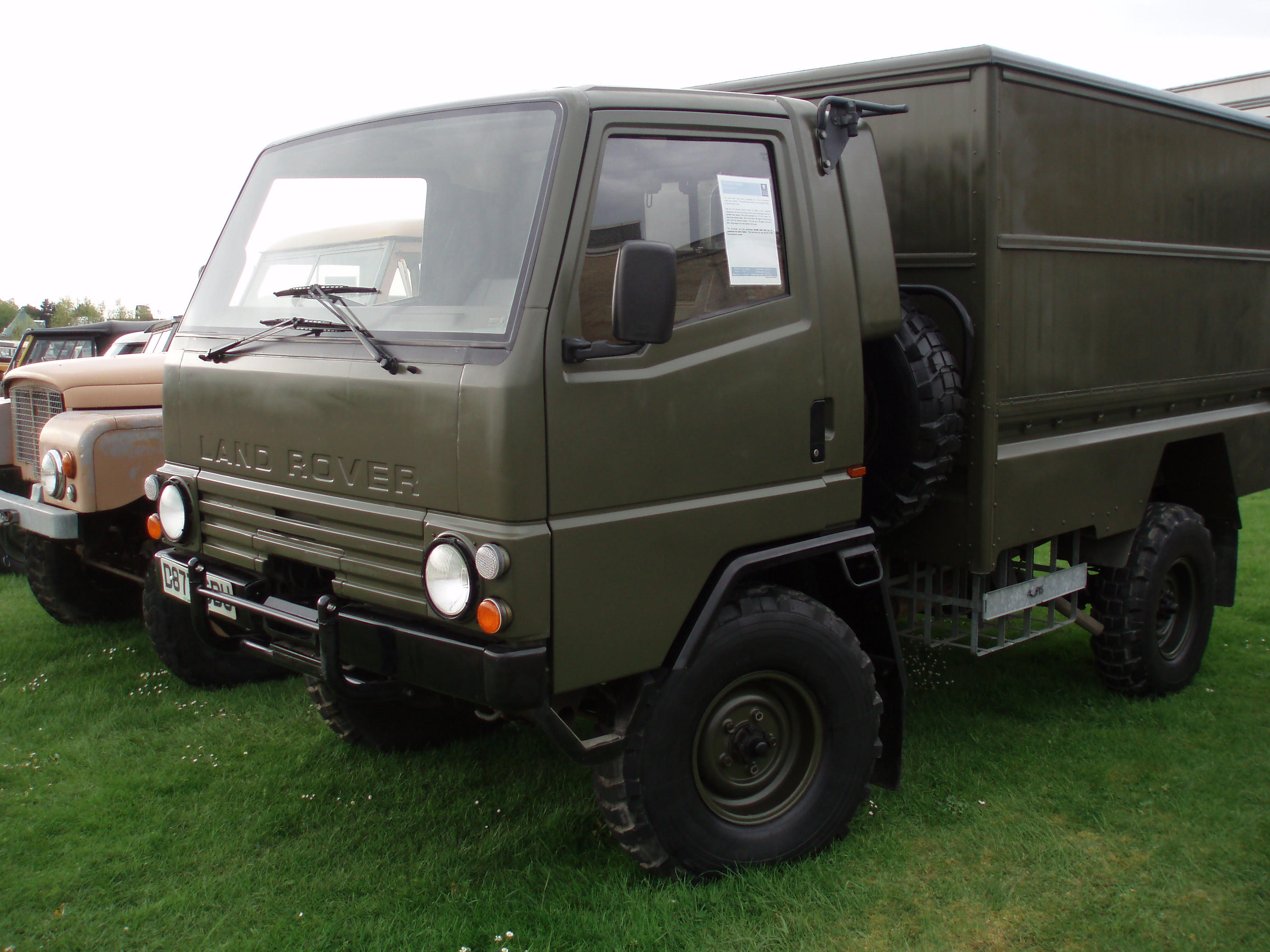
The one-off production Llama at the Heritage Motor Centre fitted with a solid rear body intended for use as either an Ambulance or a Communications vehicle. This is also one of the Llamas fitted with an under-floor recovery winch.

The name 'Llama' was only the codename given to the development project- the vehicle was actually called the Land Rover 110 Forward Control in official Land Rover documentation. However, the design is now known to enthusiasts of the Land Rover marque as 'the Llama'.

== Background ==
Land Rover as a company went through a period of restructuring in the 1980s. This involved improving the company's products, leading to the launch of the Ninety/One Ten/127 range in 1983/4 as well as updates to the Range Rover. When Rover car production left the Solihull factory, Land Rover was able to close its numerous satellite factories in Birmingham and bring engine, gearbox and other component manufacture under one roof. As part of these changes, Land Rover wanted to reduce the amount of specialist conversion work that it sent 'out of house' to other companies. This led to the creation of the Special Vehicles Division and to the start of the Llama project.

In order to open up the more heavy-duty end of the off-road vehicle market (as occupied by vehicles such as the Mercedes-Benz Unimog), it was decided to develop a version of the existing Land Rover capable of carrying larger and heavier loads. Such a vehicle would also be capable of being the basis of numerous bodystyles and equipment options.

The project was spurred on by a decision from the Ministry of Defence to replace its fleet of Land Rover 101 Forward Controls, which were gun tractors specially built by Land Rover in the 1970s. Over 1700 101s had been sold to the MoD, plus small numbers to other military buyers. At a time when Land Rover sales were falling worldwide, winning such an order would provide a much-needed boost to the company.

Land Rover had produced 'Forward Control' (i.e.- vehicles where the driving controls were positioned over or just ahead of the front axle) of its Series II models in the 1960s, based on the standard long-wheelbase chassis. It made sense to use a similar design for the new version.

== Design ==
Project Llama began in 1985. The chassis was based on that of the One Ten, and that vehicle's basic layout was adopted. The chassis was made of thicker steel than normal Land Rover chassis. Land Rover claimed that 85% of the chassis and drivetrain components of the Llama were taken from existing Land Rover models. A 3.5-litre (215 c.u.) Rover V8 with Zenith/Stromberg carburetters was used, tuned to deliver 110 horsepower (less than the power developed by the same engine in other Land Rover products). The 5-speed LT85 manual transmission from the V8-powered One Ten was used, with the LT230 two-speed, permanent 4 wheel drive transfer box.

The coil spring suspension used existing components, but with unique twin rear springs to give a 1.75-ton payload. Using standard One Ten axles (Dana-designed units built by Salisbury Engineering) led to stability problems, so bespoke units were used, being 12-inches (30 cm) wider than the standard ones.

Land Rover developed a fibreglass cab body on a steel-tube 'spaceframe'. This was hinged at the front and tilted forwards to allow access to the engine and gearbox (engine access had been an issue with the older Forward Control models). The cab was fully trimmed in plastic and rubber panels, using the instrument pod from the existing Land Rover models, and other controls and components from other Rover Group cars such as the Austin Metro and the Austin Montego. This well-equipped interior reflected Land Rover's intentions that the Llama should eventually be sold on the civilian market.

The prototypes were fitted with both 'General Service' canvas-covered rear bodies or with a steel/fibreglass box body. Some Llamas were fitted with a mechanical winch driven from the gearbox, which could be fed through the front or rear chassis cross-members for vehicle recovery.

One Llama vehicle was built on the Solihull production line to test the suitability of the vehicle to mass production and to see if the Llama could be built on the Land Rover One Ten production line.

== Trials ==
The Llama prototypes were sent to the MoD for testing. These were fitted with a variety of rear bodies to demonstrate the versatility of the design. These included the standard open drop-side rear tray, the 'General Service' version with a removable canvas hood, a demountable glass-fibre 'pod' that could be loaded and unloaded from the chassis by a hydraulic hook, a solid enclosed rear body (mocked-up as both an Ambulance and a radio communications vehicle) and one example was fitted with a mock-up missile launcher. Vehicles were subjected to load-carrying, off-road driving, stability, cold-weather and endurance/performance tests. These showed several flaws with the design. The main one was that the coil-spring suspension and high centre of gravity led to poor stability over rough ground when fully laden. The performance of the 2.5-ton vehicle was poor, especially when loaded. The petrol engine fitted to the Llama was also a problem, as the MOD had recently standardised on diesel power for all its vehicles. The V8 was Land Rover's most powerful engine available, and bringing in a more powerful diesel from another builder would remove the Llama's key selling feature- its parts commonality with the standard Land Rovers (of which the MoD had a fleet of nearly 20,000).

Land Rover built one prototype Llama powered by its 85-horsepower Diesel Turbo engine. However, this had unacceptably low performance.

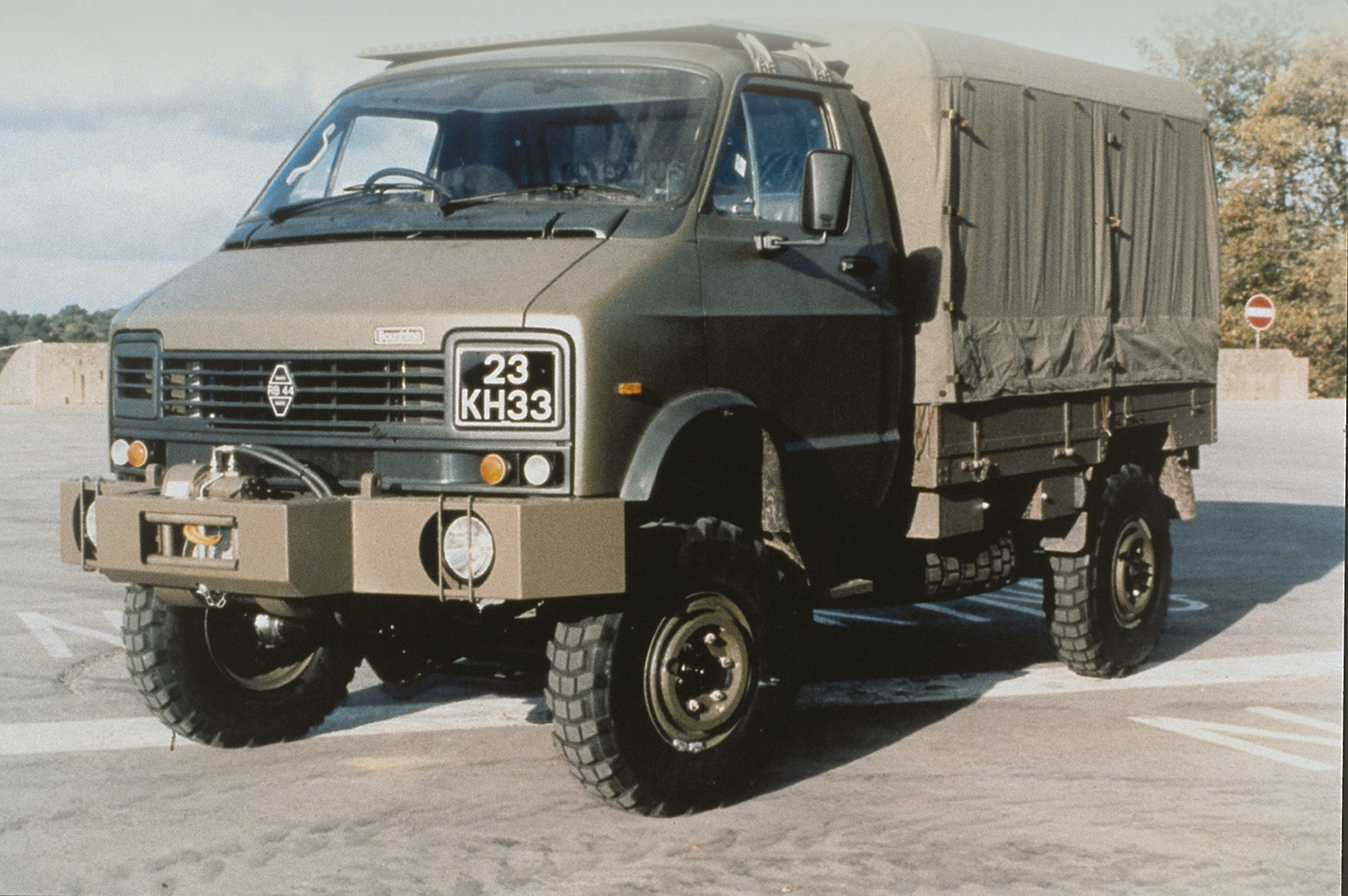
RB 44 Truck, Utility, Heavy

The MoD finally selected a 4-wheel drive version of the Dodge 50 truck, converted by Reynolds-Boughton Engineering and designated the RB44. After only a few years in service the entire fleet had to be overhauled and fitted with a crucial brake modification at major costs to the UK taxpayer. The poor reliability of the RB44 meant that the British Army opted to overhaul its fleet of Land Rover 101s, which remained in service until the early years of the 21st century.

== Cancellation ==
Without the guaranteed orders from the MoD, Land Rover did not want to risk launching the Llama on the civilian market, in direct competition to the successful Unimog, especially given the Llama's lack of a suitable engine. The project was cancelled in early 1988.

== Effect on the Land Rover Range ==
Very little new technology was developed for the Llama project, and so there was no real effect on the existing range. However, the Ninety/One Ten range, and their successors, carried a reminder of the Llama project for many years.

The cluster of warning lights on the dashboard of the Land Rover was modified in anticipation of the launch of the Llama to include a new light. This carried the symbol of a tilting lorry cab with a large exclamation mark. Its purpose would have been to warn the driver of a Llama if the locking mechanism for the tilting cab was unlocked. This new cluster was fitted to all Land Rovers from mid-1987 (with the cab-lock warning light not wired in, obviously). This design of warning light cluster remained in use on Land Rover Defenders until 1998, 10 years after the Llama project was cancelled.

== Existing Llamas ==
- The one production-line built Llama is on display at the Heritage Motor Centre at Gaydon.
- Redundant prototypes ended up being used as on-site service vehicles at the Land Rover factory in Solihull.
- Prototypes #1,2,4,5 and 10, which includes the sole turbodiesel example, are maintained by the Dunsfold Collection of historic Land Rovers at Dunsfold in Surrey.
- In 1998 a 'new' Llama was built on the bare chassis of what would have been production vehicle No.2, using several parts from the dismantled prototypes and many newly built parts. This vehicle is now road-legal and regularly appears at shows.

== Related or similar vehicles ==
- Land Rover One Ten
- Land Rover Series Forward Control
- Land Rover 101 Forward Control
- Mercedes-Benz Unimog
- Pinzgauer High Mobility All-Terrain Vehicle

== Sources ==
- Dymock, E (2006) The Land Rover File, Dove Publishing, ISBN 978-0-9534142-8-4
- Robson, G (2002) Land Rover: Series One to Freelander, Crowood Press, ISBN 978-1-86126-558-6
- Taylor, J (1988) Land Rover 1948-88: A Collector's Guide, Motor Racing Publications, 978-0947981259
- Land Rover Owner International, November 2004 issue, p28-33, Emap Automotive Publishing
- The Dunsfold Collection
