= Land Rover =

Car marque and former British car company

Land Rover (marque)

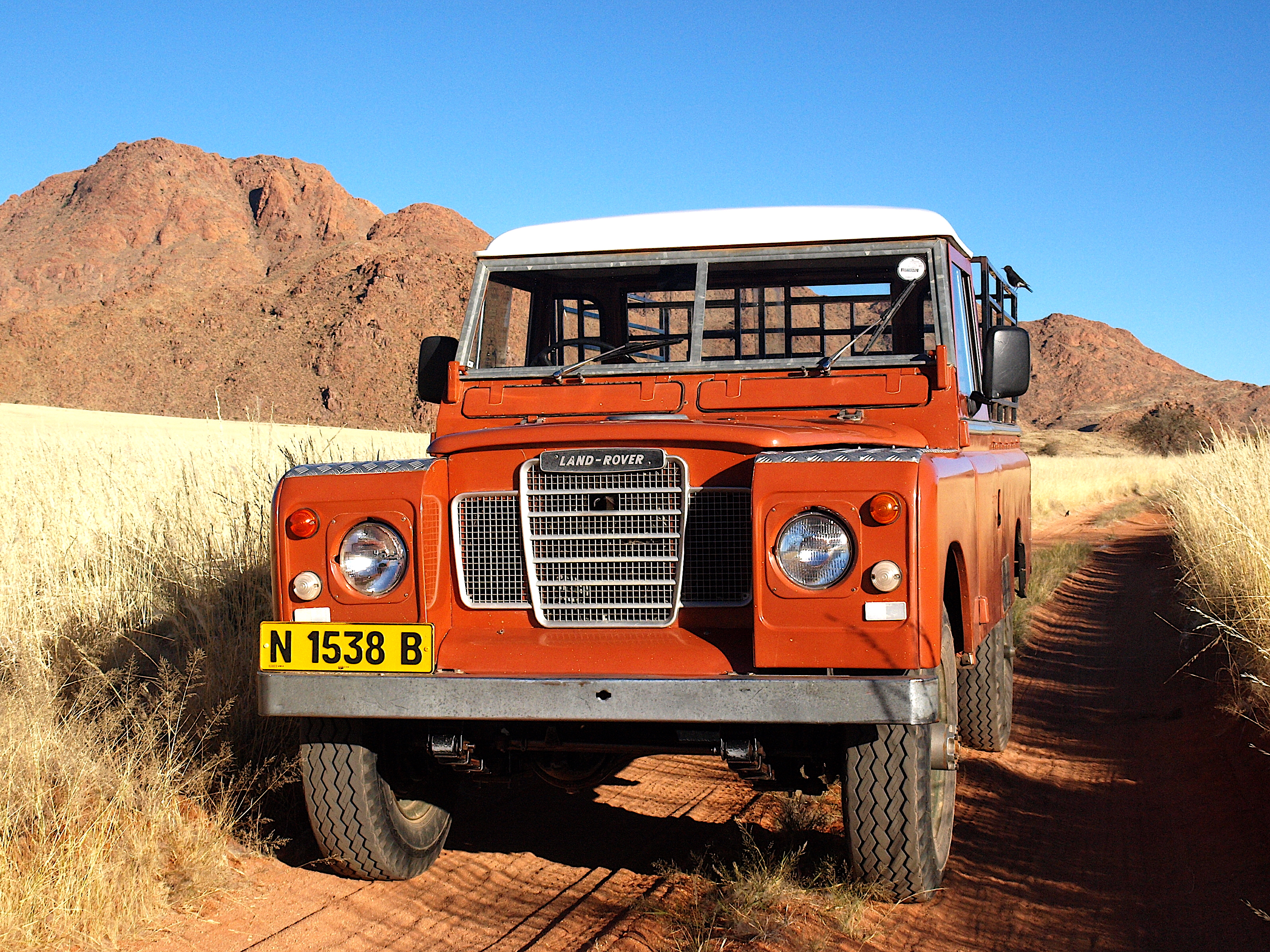
- Product type: Luxury vehicles
- Current owner: Jaguar Land Rover
- Produced by: Jaguar Land Rover
- Country: United Kingdom
- Introduced: 1948; 78 years ago
- Related brands: Jaguar
- Markets: Worldwide
- Previous owners: Rover Company (1948–1967); Leyland Motor Corporation (1967–1968); British Leyland (1968–1978); Land Rover Ltd. (1978–2012)
- Tagline: "Above & Beyond"
- Website: landrover.com

Land Rover Limited
- Industry: Automotive
- Predecessor: British Leyland
- Founded: 1978; 48 years ago
- Founder: British Leyland
- Defunct: 2012
- Fate: Merged with Jaguar Cars in 2013
- Successor: Jaguar Land Rover
- Headquarters: Solihull, West Midlands (1978–2012)
- Parent: British Leyland (1978–1986); Rover Group (1986–1994); BMW (1994–2000); Ford Motor Company (2000–2008); Tata Motors (2008–2012)

Land Rover is a brand of predominantly four-wheel drive, off-road capable vehicles, owned by British multinational car manufacturer Jaguar Land Rover (JLR), since 2008 a subsidiary of India based Tata Cars. JLR builds Land Rovers in Brazil, China, India, Slovakia, and the United Kingdom. The Land Rover name was created in 1948 by the Rover Company for a utilitarian 4WD off-road vehicle. Currently, the Land Rover range consists solely of upmarket and luxury sport utility vehicles.

Land Rover was granted a Royal Warrant by King George VI in 1951. In 2001, it received a Queen's Award for Enterprise for outstanding contribution to international trade. Over time, Land Rover grew into its own brand, and for a while also a company, encompassing a consistently growing range of four-wheel drive, off-road capable models. Starting with the much more upmarket 1970 Range Rover, and subsequent introductions of the mid-range Discovery and entry-level Freelander line, in 1989 and 1997, as well as the 1990 Land Rover Defender refresh, the marque today includes two models of Discovery, four distinct models of Range Rover, and after a three-year hiatus, a second generation of Defenders have gone into production for the 2020 model year – in short or long wheelbase, as before.

For half a century, from the original 1948 model, to 1997, when the Freelander was introduced, Land Rovers and Range Rovers exclusively relied on their trademark boxed-section vehicle frames. Land Rover used boxed frames in a direct product bloodline until the termination of the original Defender in 2016. Their last body-on-frame model was replaced by a monocoque with the third generation Discovery in 2017. Since then, all Land Rovers and Range Rovers have a unified body and frame structure.

Since 2010, Land Rover has introduced two-wheel drive variants, both of the Freelander, and of the Evoque, after having built exclusively 4WD cars for 62 years. The 2WD Freelander has been succeeded by a 2WD Discovery Sport, available in some markets.

== History ==
Originally, these vehicles were simply called the 'Land Rover' – an off-road capable car model of the Rover Company. As 'Land Rover' became established as a brand, the 'Series' indication later became a retronym model name. The Range Rover was introduced in 1970, and the company became a British Leyland subsidiary in 1978. In 1983 and 1984, the long and the short wheelbase Land Rovers were given official names – the One Ten, and the Ninety respectively. Together they were badged the Defender models in 1990, after the 1989 introduction of the new Discovery model.

=== Rover era ===
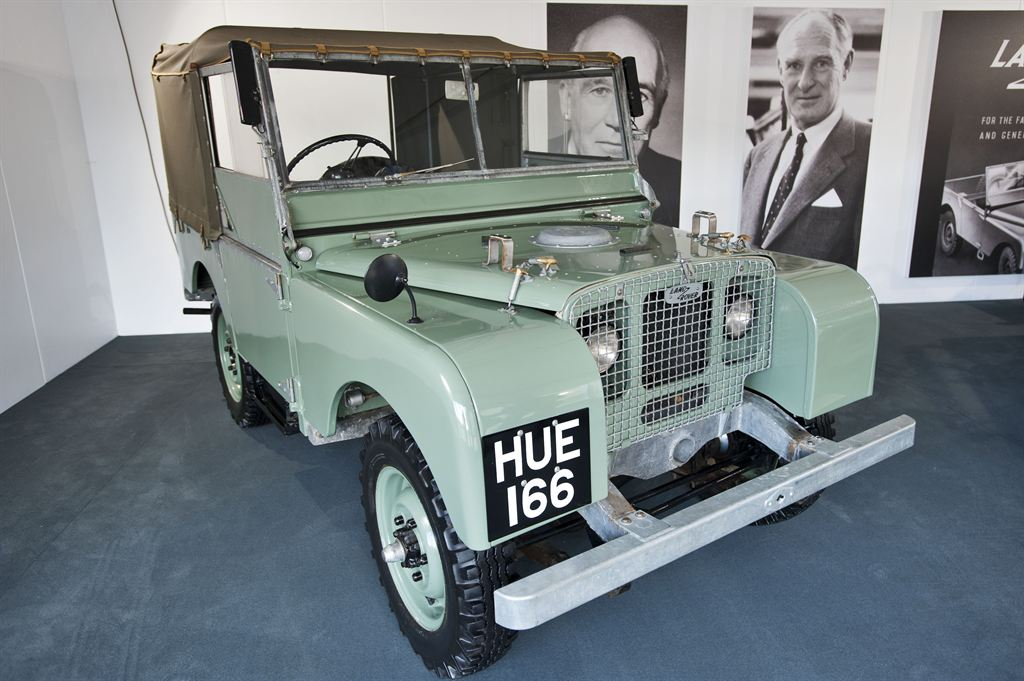
Series I first registered January 1949 "HUE166 first production Land-Rover" portraits of Spencer and Maurice Wilks

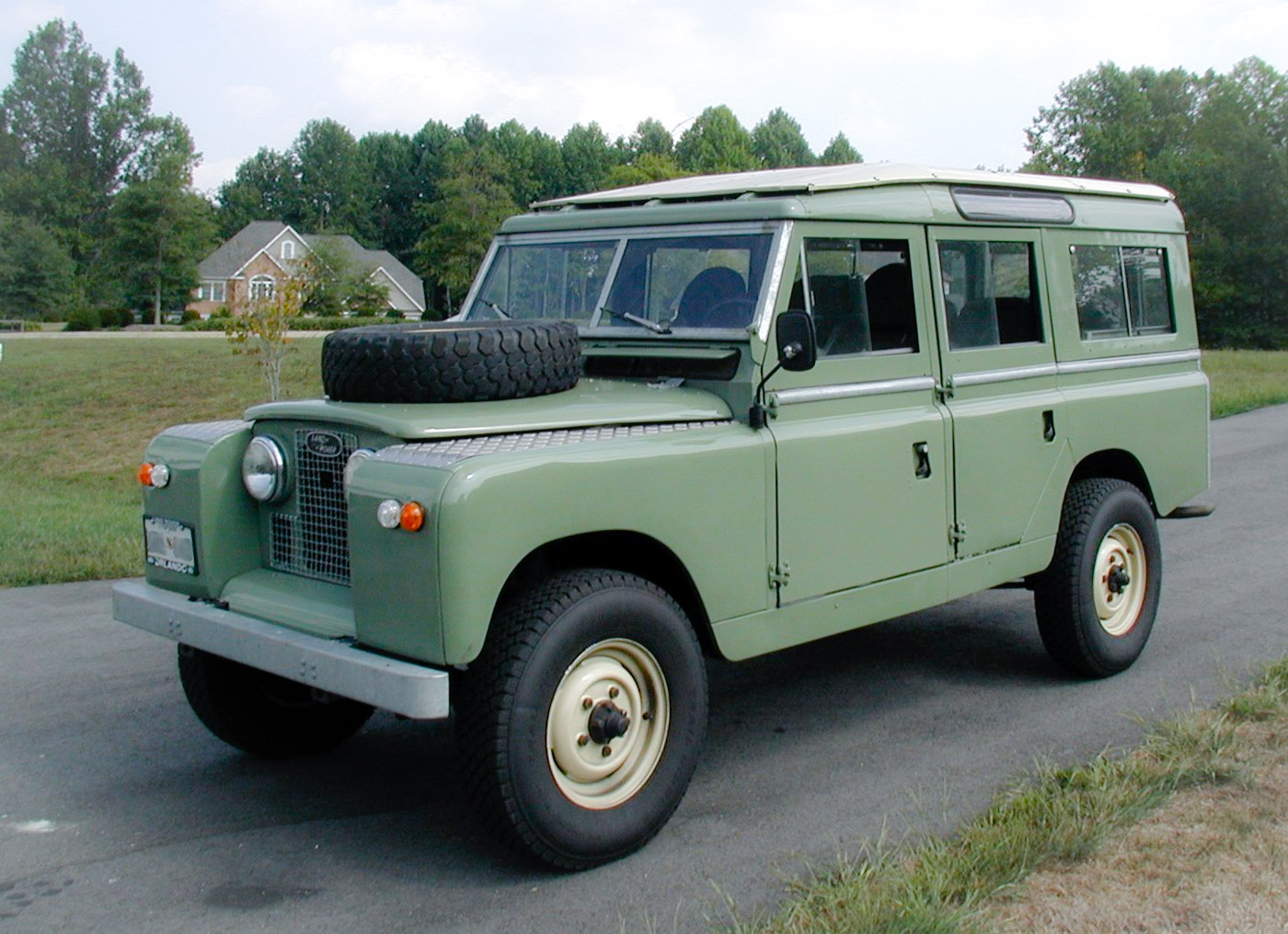
Series IIA long-wheelbase

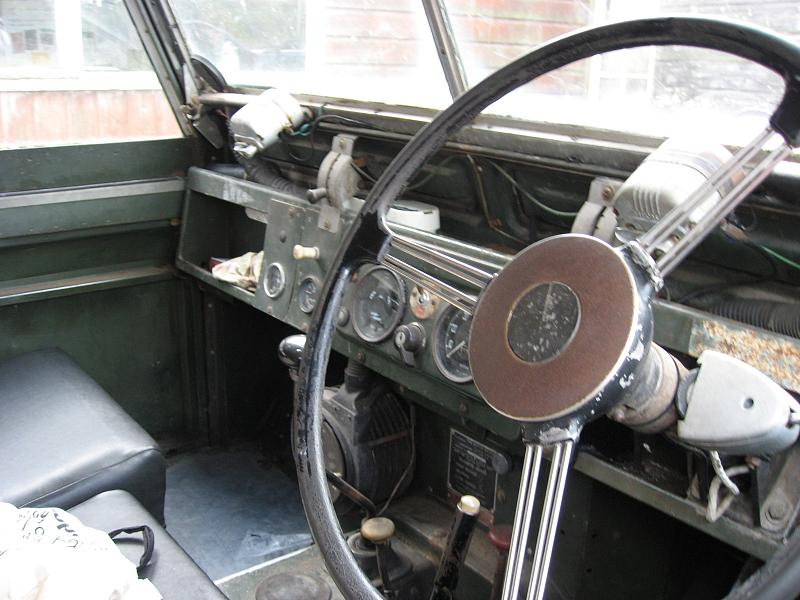
Series IIA dashboard

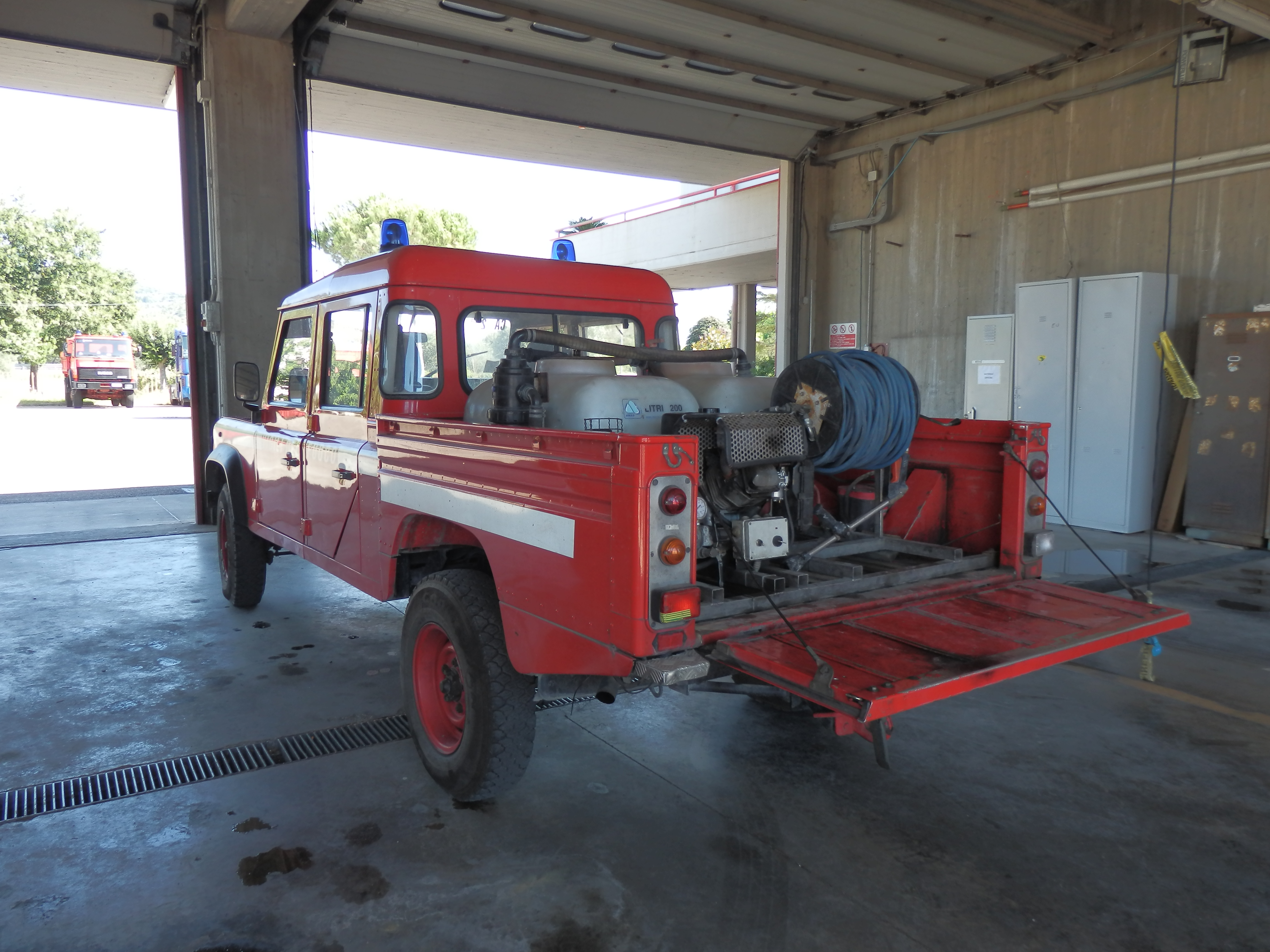
Land Rover conversion to fight forest fires, Cascina, Italy (August 2016)

Maurice Wilks worked on the design from 1947. Wilks, chief designer at the Rover Company, on his farm in Newborough, Anglesey, worked in conjunction with his brother Spencer who was the managing director of Rover. The design may have been influenced by the Jeep and the prototype, later nicknamed Centre Steer, was built on a Jeep chassis and axles. The early choice of colour was dictated by military surplus supplies of aircraft cockpit paint, so early vehicles were only available in various shades of light green. Starting with the series I Land Rover, all models in this era featured box-section ladder-frame chassis. Early vehicles including the Series I were field-tested at Long Bennington and designed to be field-serviced.

After the formation of Land Rover Limited in 1978 the hyphen in Land-Rover – as shown in the logo – was gradually phased out.

=== Land Rover Ltd – subsidiary of BL ===
Land Rover as a company has existed since 1978. Prior to this, it was a product line of the Rover Company, which was absorbed into the Rover-Triumph division of the British Leyland Motor Corporation (BL) following Leyland Motor Corporation's takeover of Rover in 1967. The ongoing commercial success of the original Land Rover series models and the Range Rover in the 1970s, in the midst of BL's well-documented business troubles, prompted the establishment of a separate Land Rover company under the BL umbrella, remaining part of the subsequent Rover Group in 1988 under the ownership of British Aerospace, after British Leyland was broken up and privatised.

=== BMW era ===
On 31 January 1994, Rover Group plc, including Land Rover, was acquired by BMW. In 2000, Rover Group was broken up by BMW and Land Rover was sold on to Ford Motor Company, becoming part of its Premier Automotive Group. The transition to BMW ownership only just preceded the introduction of the second generation Range Rover, prior to launching Land Rover's first unibody model, the Freelander in 1997. BMW was then responsible for much of the development of the Range Rover III – the first to have a monocoque structure and independent suspension, introduced under Ford in late 2001.

=== Ford era ===
After the introduction of the all-new Range Rover in 2001, Ford moved Land Rover further away from its traditional boxed ladder-frames, by introducing a new generation Discovery featuring "Integrated Body Frame", in 2004. From then on, only the Defender continued on Land Rover's traditional since 1948 underpinnings. Use of the Rover V8 engine in Land Rovers also ended with the replacement of the mk. II Discovery.

In 2006 Ford also purchased the Rover brand from BMW for around £6 million. BMW had retained ownership of the brand to protect the integrity of the Land Rover brand, with which 'Rover' might be confused in the US – market, and allowed it to be used under licence by MG Rover until it collapsed in 2005, at which point it was offered to the Ford Motor Company, who by then owned Land Rover. On 11 June 2007, Ford announced that it planned to sell Land Rover along with Jaguar Cars. Private equity firms such as Alchemy Partners of the UK, TPG Capital, Ripplewood Holdings, Cerberus Capital Management and One Equity Partners of the US, Tata Motors of India and a consortium comprising Mahindra & Mahindra of India and Apollo Management all initially expressed interest in purchasing the marques from the Ford Motor Company. On 1 January 2008, Ford formally declared that Tata was the preferred bidder. On 26 March 2008, Ford announced that it had agreed to sell its Jaguar and Land Rover operations to Tata Motors, and that it expected to complete the sale by the end of the second quarter of 2008.

=== Tata Motors era ===
On 18 January 2008, Tata Motors, a part of the Tata Group, established Jaguar Land Rover Limited as a British-registered and wholly owned subsidiary. The new company was to be used as a holding company for the acquisition of the two businesses from Ford – Jaguar Cars Limited and Land Rover. That acquisition was completed on 2 June 2008 at a cost of £1.7 billion. Included in the deal to buy Land Rover and Jaguar Cars were the rights to three other British brands: the Daimler marque, as well as two dormant brands Lanchester and Rover.

On 1 January 2013, the group, which had been operating as two separate companies (Jaguar Cars Limited and Land Rover), although on an integrated basis, underwent a fundamental restructuring. The parent company was renamed to Jaguar Land Rover Automotive PLC, Jaguar Cars Limited was renamed to Jaguar Land Rover Limited and the assets (excluding certain Chinese interests) of Land Rover were transferred to it. The consequence was that Jaguar Land Rover Limited became responsible in the UK for the design, manufacture and marketing of both Jaguar and Land Rover branded products, and Land Rover and Jaguar Cars ceased to be separate vehicle producing entities.

=== Timeline ===
- 1947: Rover's chief designer Maurice Wilks and his associates create a prototype using Jeep chassis and components
- 1948: The first Land Rover was officially launched on 30 April 1948, at the Amsterdam Motor Show
- 1958: Series II launched
- 1961: Series IIA began production
- 1967: Rover becomes part of Leyland Motors, later British Leyland (BL) as Rover Triumph
- 1970: Introduction of the Range Rover
- 1971: Series III launched
- 1974: Land Rover abandons US market facing competitive pressure from Japanese – brands
- 1975: BL collapses and is nationalised, publication of the Ryder Report recommends that Land Rover be split from Rover and be treated as a separate company within BL and becomes part of the new commercial vehicle division called the Land Rover Leyland Group
- 1976: One-millionth Land Rover leaves the production line
- 1978: Land Rover Limited formed as a separate subsidiary of British Leyland
- 1980: Rover car production ends at Solihull with the transfer of SD1 production to Cowley, Oxford; Solihull is now exclusively for Land Rover manufacture. 5-door Range Rover introduced
- 1983: Land Rover 90 (Ninety)/110 (One-Ten)/127 (renamed Defender in 1990) introduced
- 1986: BL plc becomes Rover Group plc; Project Llama started
- 1987: Range Rover is finally introduced to the US market, following many years of demand being filled by grey market sales
- 1988: Rover Group is privatised and becomes part of British Aerospace, and is now known simply as Rover
- 1989: Introduction of Discovery
- 1990: The Ninety and One-Ten range of models are given the generic name of Defender
- 1994: Rover Group is taken over by BMW. Introduction of second-generation Range Rover. (The original Range Rover was continued under the name 'Range Rover Classic' until 1995)
- 1997: Land Rover introduces the Special Edition Discovery XD with AA yellow paint, subdued wheels, SD type roof racks, and a few other off-road upgrades directly from the factory. Produced only for the North American market, the Special Vehicles Division of Land Rover created only 250 of these bright yellow SUVs.
- 1997: Introduction of Freelander
- 1998: Introduction of mark II Discovery
- 2000: BMW breaks up the Rover Group and sells Land Rover to Ford for £1.8 billion
- 2002: Introduction of third-generation Range Rover
- 2004: Introduction of second-generation Discovery, marketed as the Discovery 3, or LR3, depending on market
- 2005: Introduction of Range Rover Sport
- 2005: Adoption of Jaguar AJ-V8 engine to replace the BMW M62 V8 in the Range Rover
- 2006: Announcement of a new 2.4-litre diesel engine, 6-speed gearbox, dash and forward-facing rear seats for Defender. Introduction of the second generation of Freelander (Freelander 2). Ford acquires the Rover trademark from BMW, who previously licensed its use to MG Rover Group
- 8 May 2007: 4,000,000th Land Rover rolls off the production line, a Discovery 3 (LR3), donated to The Born Free Foundation
- 12 June 2007: Announcement from the Ford Motor Company that it plans to sell Land Rover and also Jaguar Cars
- August 2007: Tata Motors and Mahindra & Mahindra as well as financial sponsors Cerberus Capital Management, TPG Capital and Apollo Global Management expressed their interest in purchasing Jaguar Cars and Land Rover from the Ford Motor Company.
- 26 March 2008: Ford agreed to sell the Jaguar and Land Rover operations to Tata Motors.
- 2 June 2008: Tata Motors finalised their purchase of Jaguar and Land Rover from Ford and put them into their new subsidiary, Jaguar Land Rover
- 2010: Introduction of Discovery 4 / LR4
- 2011: The Range Rover Evoque introduced
- 2012: Fourth-generation Range Rover was exhibited at the 2012 Paris Motor Show
- 1 January 2013: Land Rover and Jaguar Cars merged to form a single company, Jaguar Land Rover Limited, producing vehicles under both marques
- 2014: The New Discovery Range was unveiled at the 2014 New York Motor Show
- 1 March 2017: The Range Rover Velar was unveiled in London
- June 2018: representatives of the company Land Rover announced the launch of a new project called "Cortex", for the implementation of which will be spent about $5 million. The goal of this project is "to create self-propelled cars-robots that are able to independently navigate off-road in all weather conditions."
- September 2019: Land Rover announces it is working on a remote control system for its new Defender that would allow low-speed driving from outside the car
- 2020: Land Rover Defender (L663) is released.

== Manufacturing ==
Jaguar Land Rover manufactures Land Rover cars in plants in five countries. In the United Kingdom the Range Rover, Range Rover Sport and Range Rover Velar are built at their Solihull plant near Birmingham and the Discovery Sport and Evoque are built at their Halewood plant near Liverpool. In October 2018, JLR opened a new plant in Nitra, Slovakia, to build the Discovery, and are now also building the 2020 Defender there. In Brazil the company builds both the Discovery Sport and Evoque in their plant in Itatiaia, which was opened in June 2016. JLR has been building cars since 2011 in Pune, India, and currently builds the Discovery Sport and Evoque there. Under a 50/50 joint venture with Chery at Changshu in China, Discovery Sports and Evoques are also built.

Historically Land Rovers were manufactured primarily at the Solihull plant until production of the Freelander was moved to the Halewood plant. The Freelander was also assembled in CKD form at Land Rover's facility in Pune, India. As of 2015, the company continued to expand by building locally in India as well as increasing the number of models made at JLR's Chikhali facility near Pune to include the Discovery Sport and Evoque.

Defender models were assembled under licence in several locations worldwide, including Spain (Santana Motors), Iran (Pazhan Morattab), Brazil (Karmann), and Turkey (Otokar).

== Global sales ==
=== Global and regional unit sales ===
Worldwide sales of Land Rover tripled from model year 2008/'09 to 2014/'15 (from almost 130,000 to some 385,000 units), to peak at a further 10% higher in '15/'16 and '16/'17, and have since slid by some 100,000 (to 320,000 units) in 2018/'19. In spite of the facts, that Australia and New Zealand were important Land Rover markets in the 20th century, and sales in the Asia Pacific region have quadrupled from 2008/'09 to 2014/'15, Land Rover have stopped publishing sales of that region separately – instead including them in "Rest of World" starting 2015/'16.

Overall, Europe is the firm's primary market, consistently yielding 40% to 50% of global units sold. Generally, half of that is down to the home (UK) market. Sales in the U.K. and the U.S. have generally kept equal pace, but since 2012 China has taken the lead as Land Rover's biggest single country market, except for 2018/'19.

Per calendar year:

Year	2009	2010	2011	2012	2013	2014	2015	2016
Units sold	144,371	181,395	223,602	303,926	348,338	381,108	403,079	434,582

Per model year:

model year	United Kingdom	Europe (continent)	North America	China*	Asia Pacific**	Rest of world	Total
'08 / '09	25,197	33,040	23,008	7,536	5,436	34,327	128,544
'09 / '10	39,085	39,086	29,319	14,962	6,092	28,633	157,177
'10 / '11	42,125	42,732	36,041	26,009	7,288	34,892	189,087
'11 / '12	46,257	58,213	44,136	44,622	10,485	47,919	251,632
'12 / '13	57,186	70,252	49,931	67,579	14,008	57,087	316,043
'13 / '14	60,019	71,525	56,214	83,186	17,787	65,058	353,789
'14 / '15	68,882	78,140	61,555	95,528	21,548	59,626	385,279
'15 / '16	79,723	103,683	83,133	79,937		80,646	427,122
'16 / '17	85,623	100,711	81,949	95,856		67,022	431,161
'17 / '18	58,417	78,836	68,519	89,975		56,224	351,971
'18 / '19	60,791	60,168	83,389	57,801		57,882	320,031
* China includes data for 2015/16 onwards of Chery Jaguar Land Rover (CJLR) sales. ** Asia Pacific is merged into the rest of world heading from 2015/16 onwards.

=== Unit sales by model ===
The Discovery Sport is the most successful Land Rover model, selling 95,520 units globally in 2018. This was followed by another 'sports' model, the Range Rover Sport, at 77,847 units. The Discovery Sport is the successor to the brands Freelander model, which was Europe's best selling – for five years in a row, after its market introduction in 1997.

== Models ==
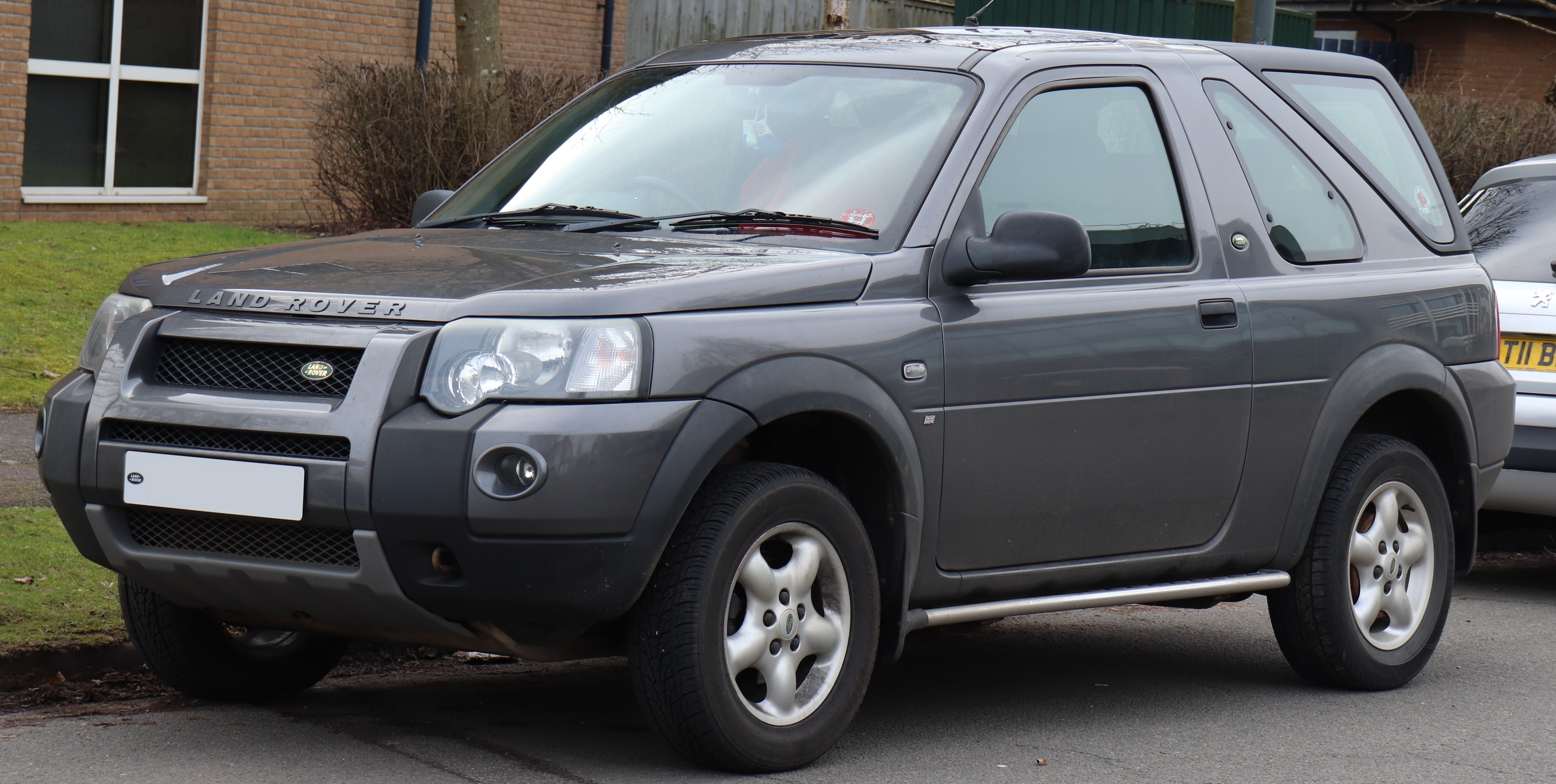
Land Rover Freelander

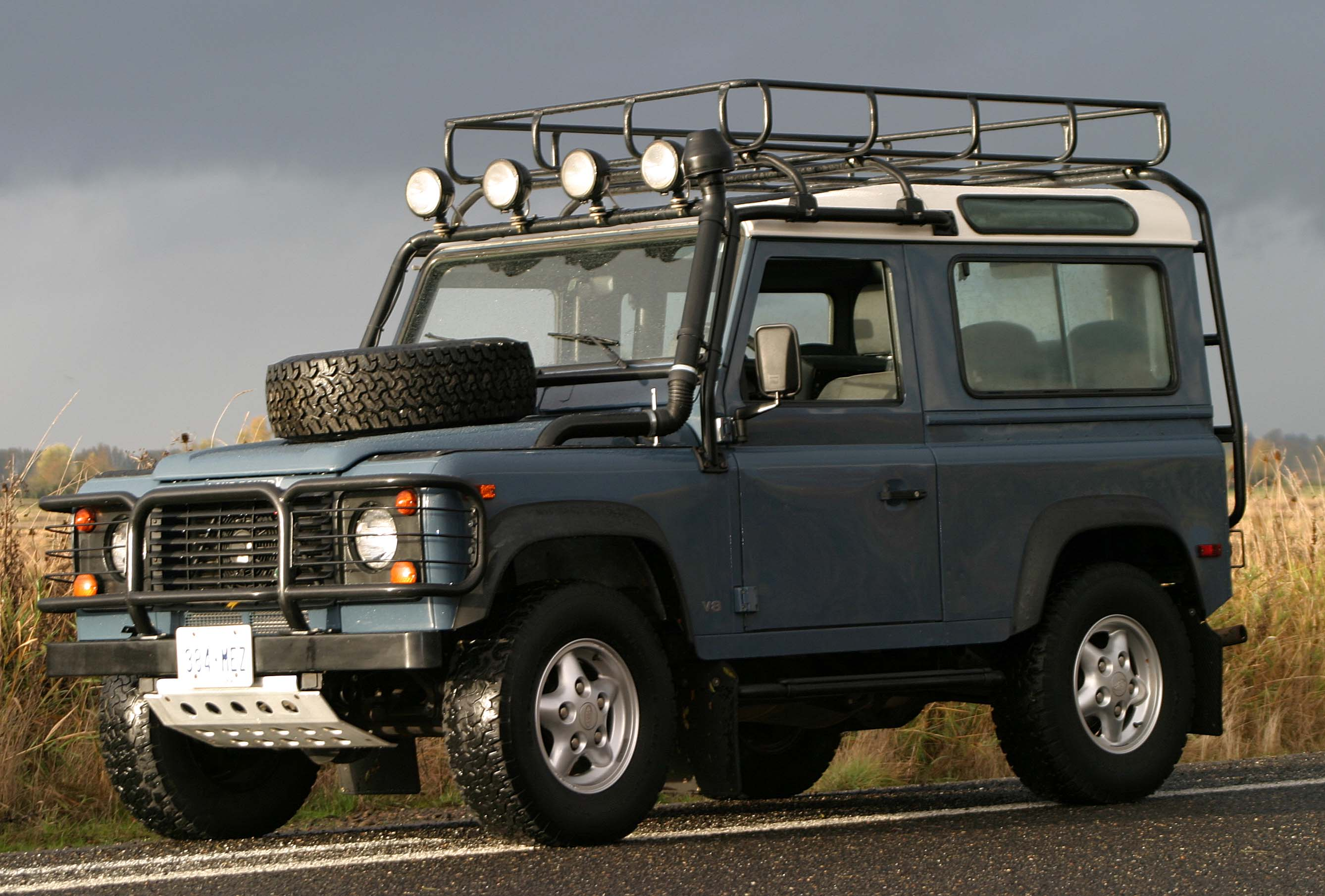
The 1997 Defender 90

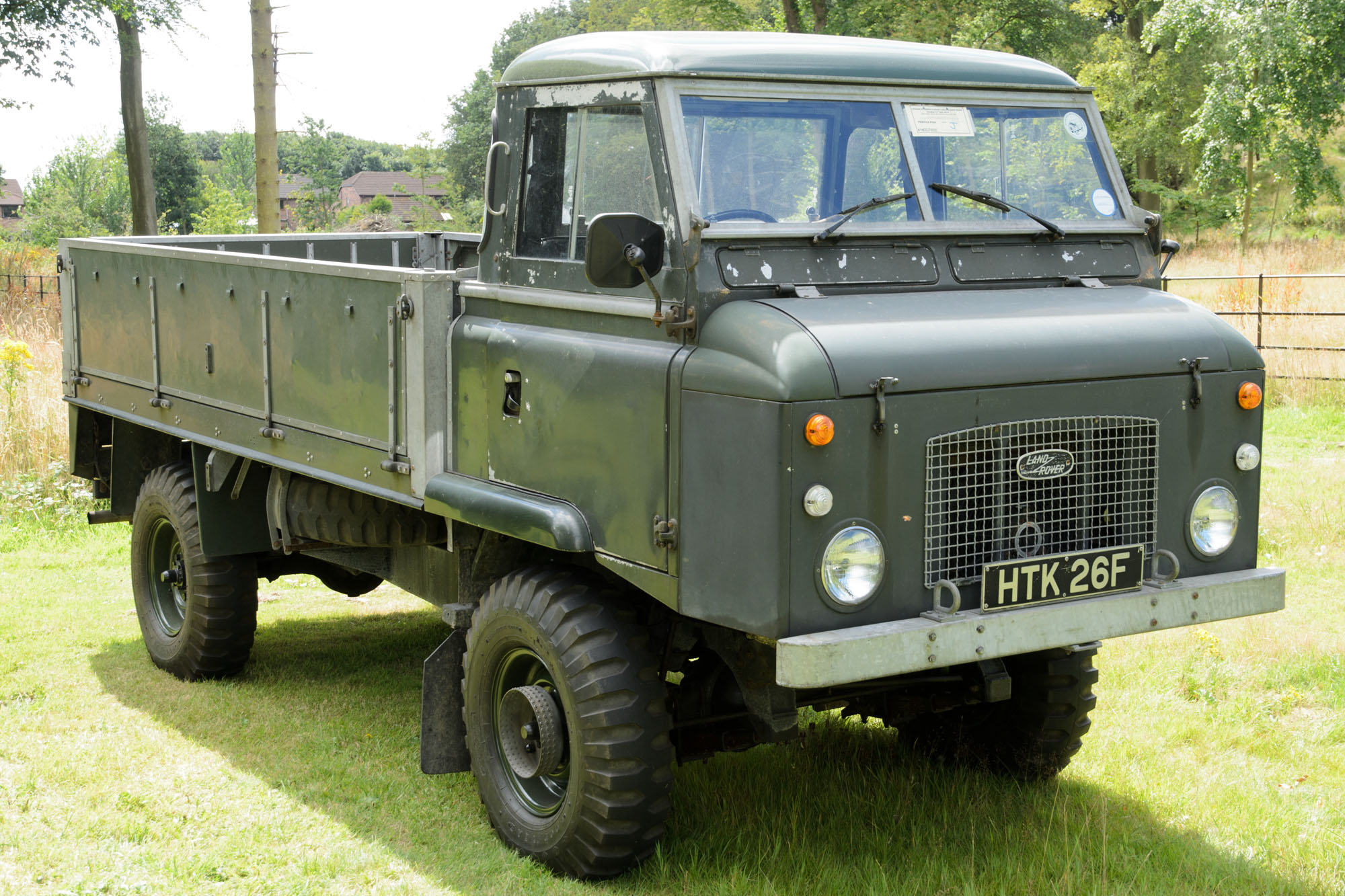
Series IIB Forward Control

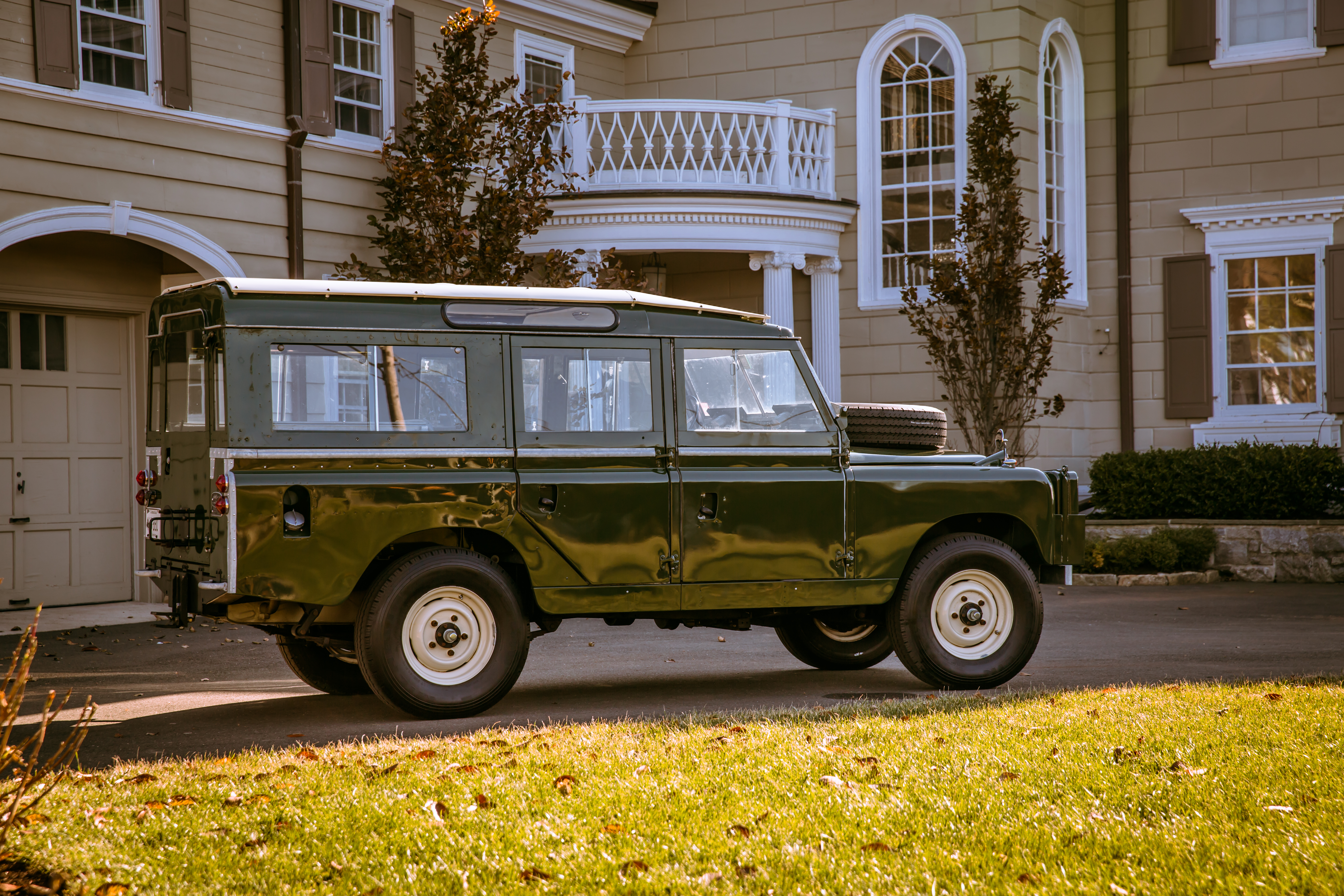
Series II 109in

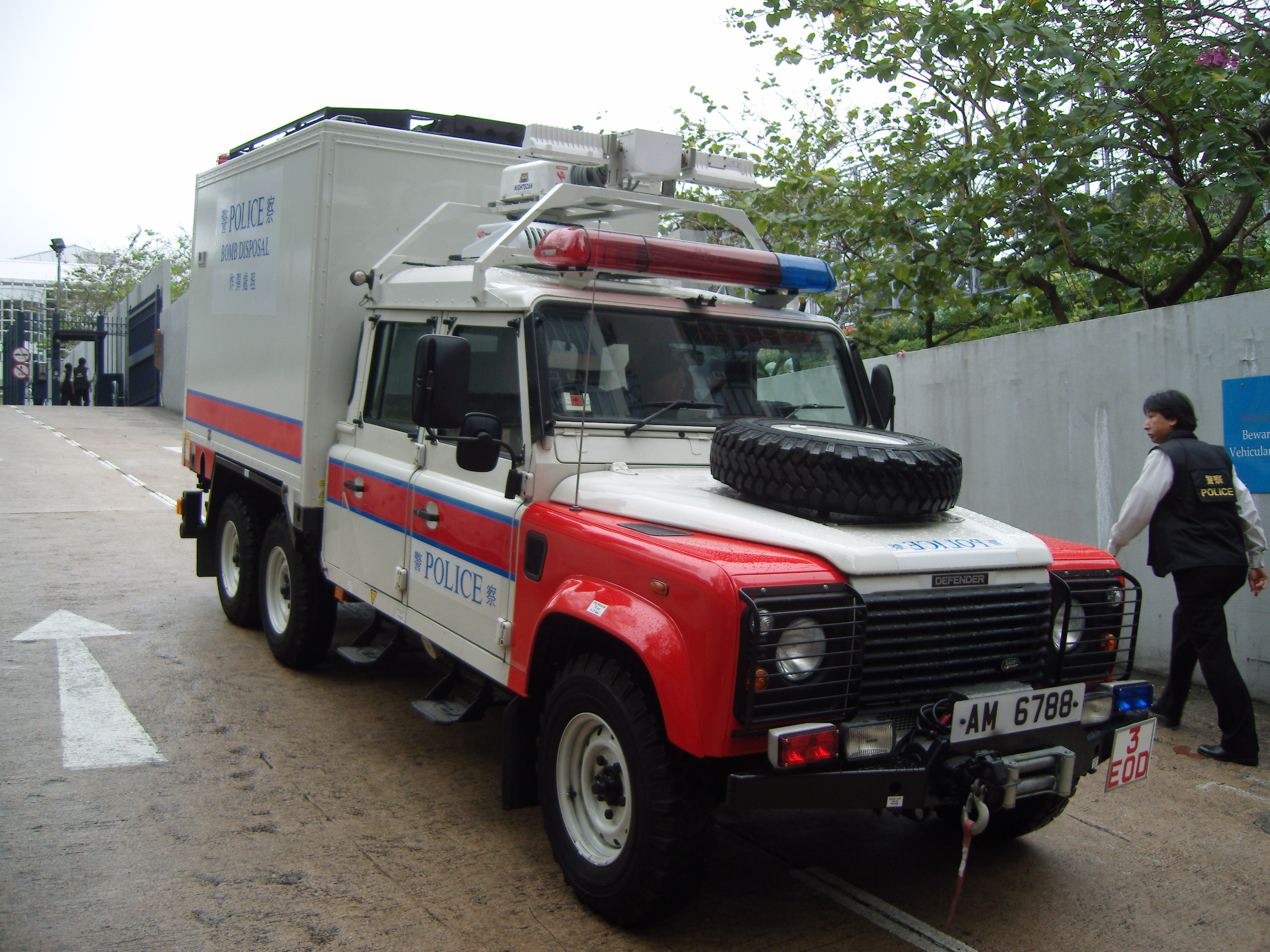
Six-wheel Land Rover Defender, Hong Kong Police Bomb Disposal

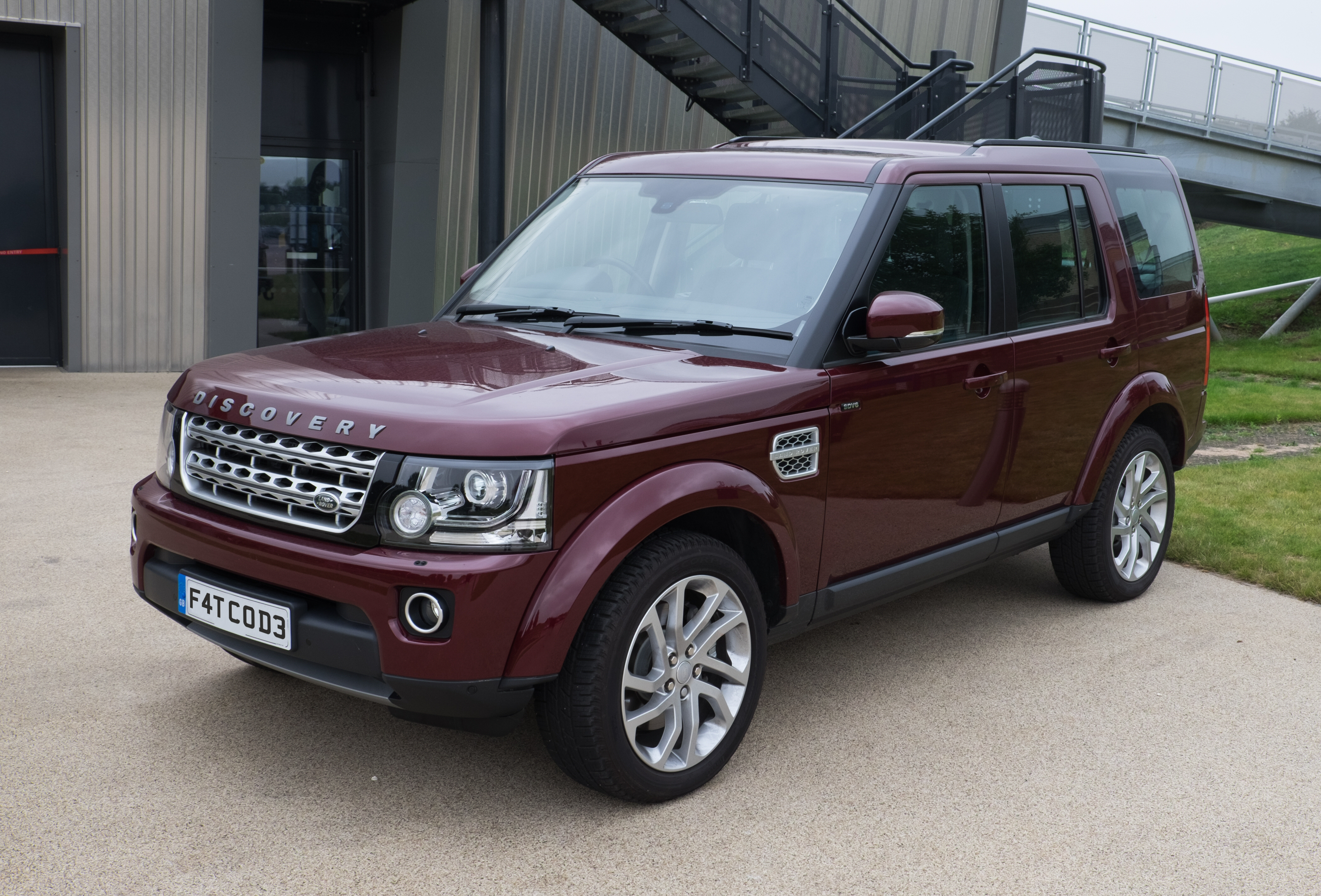
2016 Land Rover Discovery 4 – front

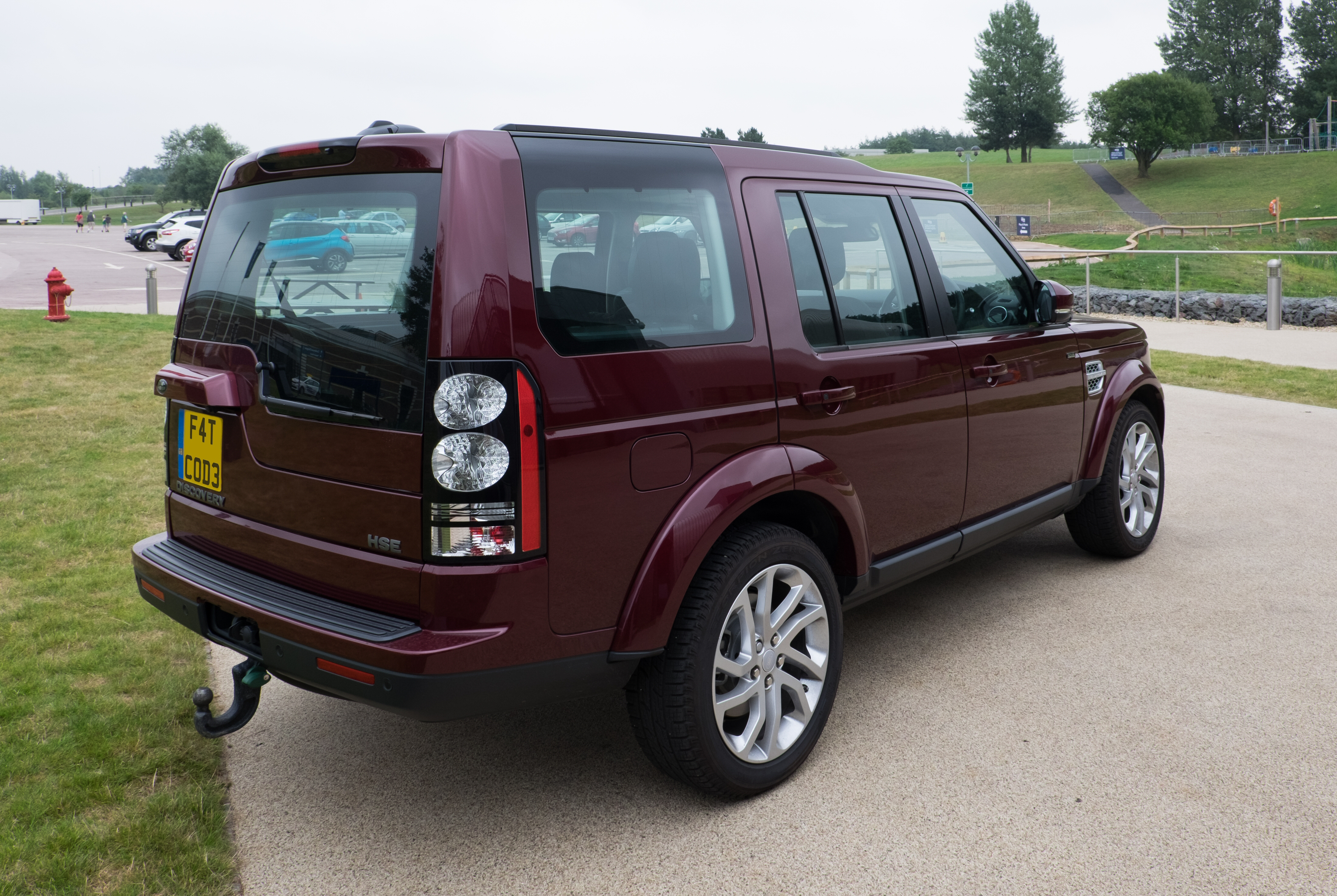
2016 Land Rover Discovery 4 – rear

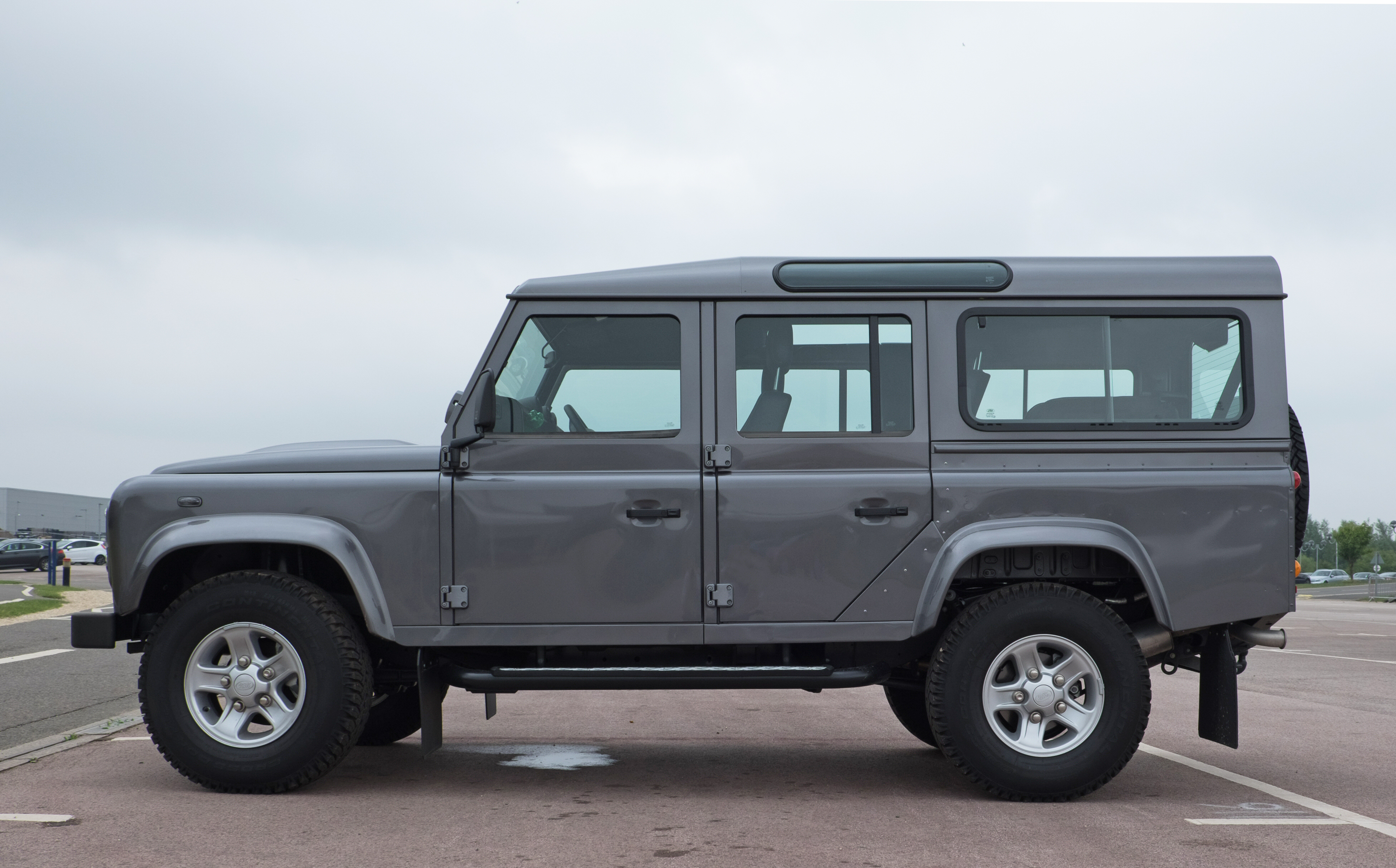
2016 Land Rover Defender 110 Station Wagon

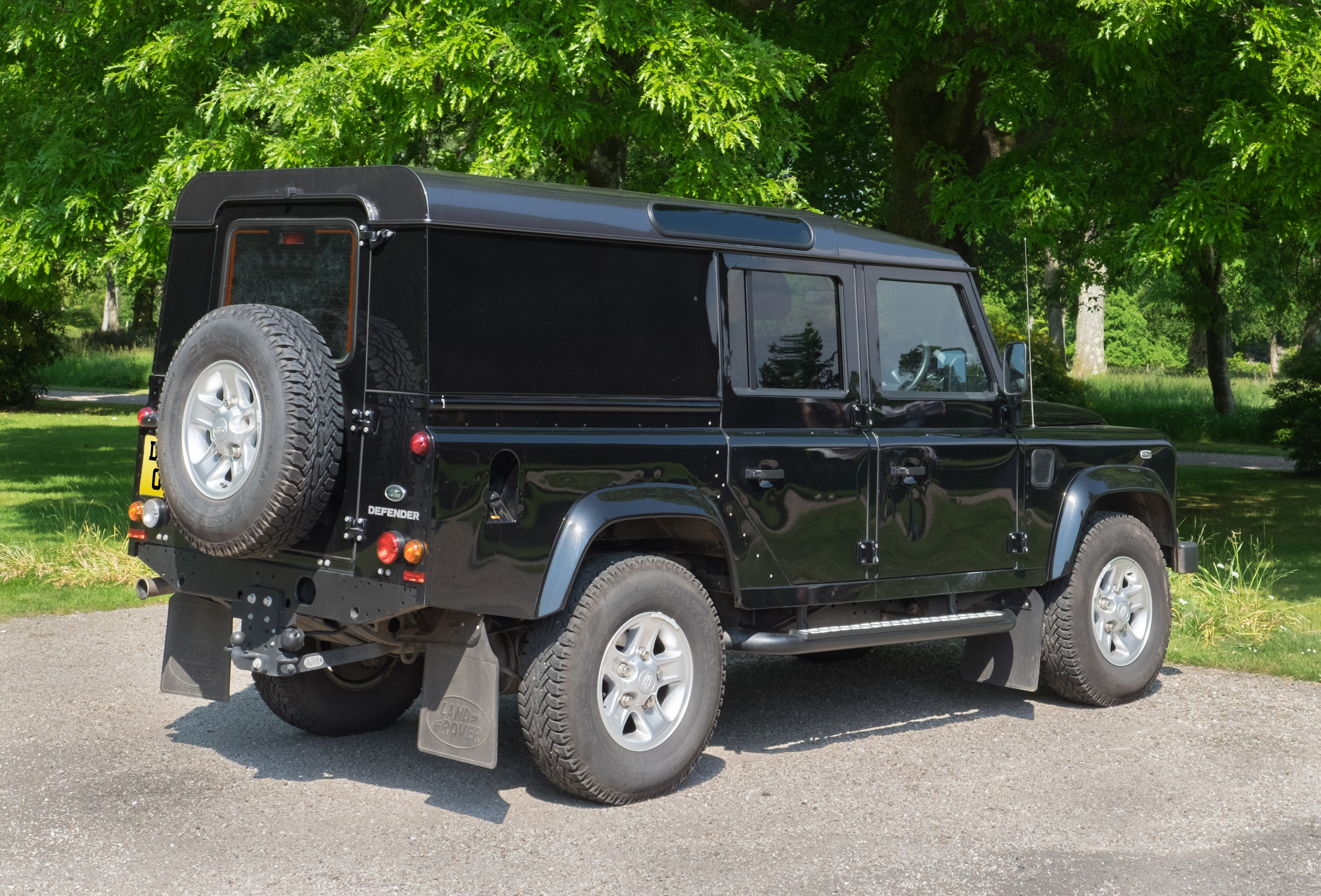
2015 Land Rover Defender 110 XS TD DC

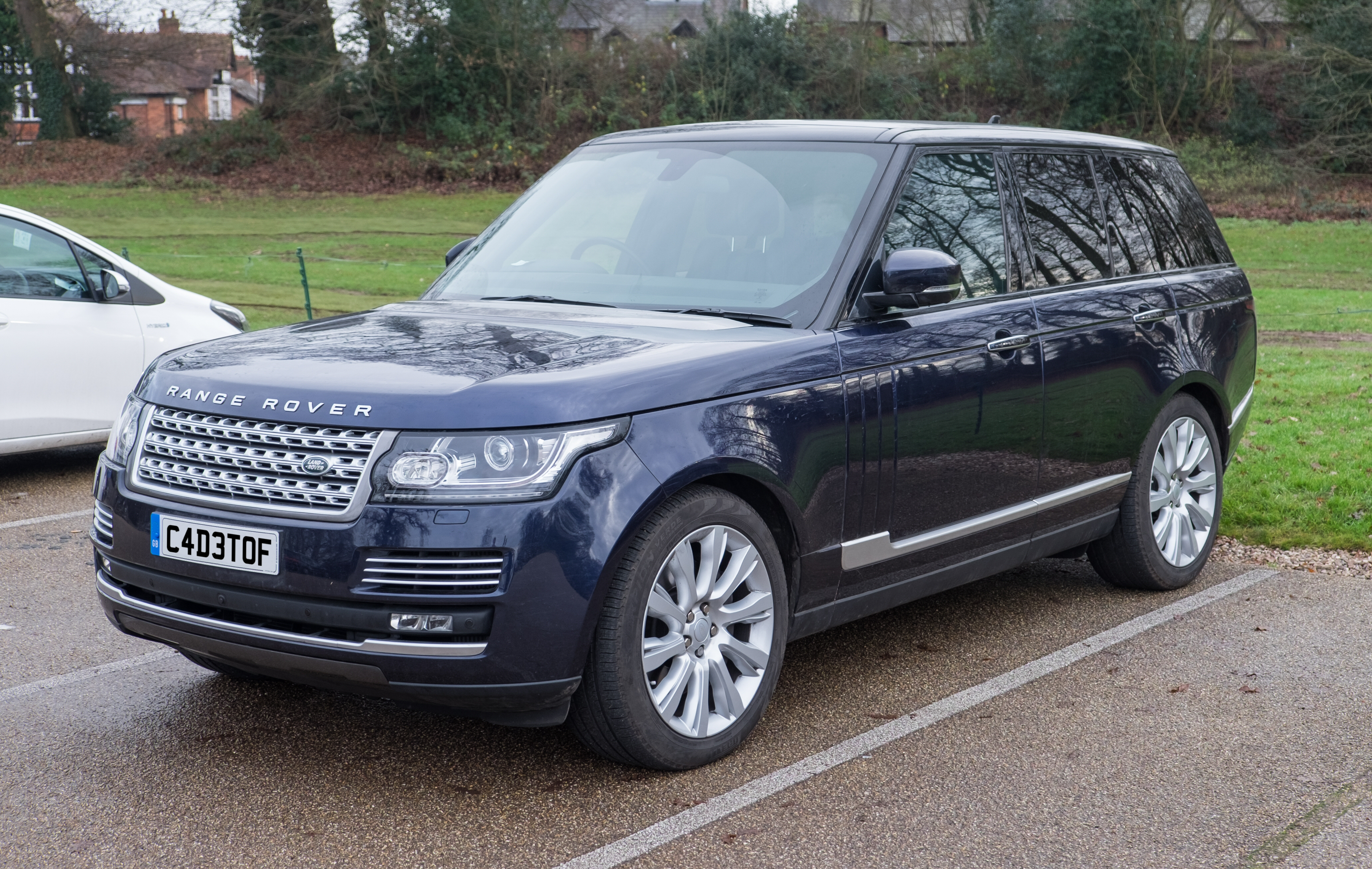
2016 Range Rover Autobiography

=== Historic ===
- Series I, II, IIA and III
- Freelander (sold in some markets as LR2)
- Defender

=== Current ===
- Defender (L663)
- Discovery
- Discovery Sport (until December 2026)
- Range Rover
- Range Rover Sport
- Range Rover Velar
- Range Rover Evoque

== Concepts ==
Range Stormer – Land Rover's first concept vehicle, unveiled at the 2004 North American International Auto Show, later became the Range Rover Sport. (Gritzinger, 2004).

Land Rover LRX – Land Rover's second concept vehicle, first unveiled at the 2008 Detroit Auto Show. Originally a vehicle with ERAD technology, the production version did not include this. The car was then launched in 2011 as the Range Rover Evoque, and was the first Range Rover branded product to be offered with front wheel drive, and no low ratio transfer box.

Land Rover DC100 – Land Rover's third concept vehicle, first unveiled at the 2011 Frankfurt Auto Show, designed to be a replacement for the Land Rover Defender, though it is unlikely that the Defender's replacement will be exactly the same as the DC100 concept.

Land Rover Discovery Vision Concept – Land Rover's fourth concept vehicle, first unveiled at the 2014, was designed to be a replacement for the Land Rover Discovery, This concept features Transparent Bonnet, Suicide doors, and Laser assisted lamps (there is a very little chance this will be included in any future production vehicles).

=== Military ===
Models developed for the UK Ministry of Defence (MoD) include:

- 101 Forward Control – also known as the "Land Rover One Tonne FC"
- 1/2 ton Lightweight – airportable military short-wheelbase from the Series 2a
- Land Rover Wolf – an uprated Military Defender
- Snatch Land Rover – Land Rover with composite armoured body in UK Armed Forces Service
- 109 Series IIa and III ambulance (body by Marshalls of Cambridge)
- Range Rover '6×6' Fire Appliance (conversion by Carmichael and Sons of Worcester) for RAF airfield use
- 130 Defender ambulance
- 'Llama' prototypes for 101 replacement

Models developed for the Australian Army

- Land Rover Perentie 4×4 and 6×6

=== Engines ===
During the history of the Land Rover many different engines have been fitted:

- The inlet-over-exhaust petrol engines ("semi side-valve"), in both four- and six-cylinder variants, which were used for the first Land Rovers in 1948, and which had their origins in pre-war Rover cars. Displacement of the first models was 1,600 cc.
- The four-cylinder overhead-valve engines, both petrol and diesel, which first appeared (in diesel form) in 1957, near the end of Series One production, and evolved over the years to the 300 TDi turbodiesel, which remains in production today for some overseas markets.
- The Buick-sourced all aluminium Rover V8 engine.
- 1,997 cc Petrol, inlet-over-exhaust: Series I engine, carried over for the first few months of Series II production.
- 2,052 cc Diesel, overhead-valve: Land Rover's first diesel engine, and one of the first small high-speed diesels produced in the UK. It appeared in 1957, and was used in Series II production until 1961. Looks almost identical to the later 2,286 cc engine, but many internal differences. It produced 51 bhp (38 kW).
- 2,286 cc Petrol, overhead-valve, three-bearing crank:
- 2,286 cc Diesel, overhead-valve, three-bearing crank: Appeared in 1961 alongside the redesigned 2,286 cc petrol engine at the start of Series IIA production, and shared its cylinder block and some other components. It produced 62 bhp (46 kW).
- 2,625 cc Petrol, inlet-over-exhaust: Borrowed from the Rover saloon range, in response to demands from mid-1960s Land Rover users for more power and torque.
- 2,286 cc petrol/diesel, overhead-valve type 11J: five-bearing crank: In 1980, Land Rover finally did something about the crank failures which had plagued its four-cylinder engines for 22 years. These engines lasted beyond the end of Series III production and into the first couple of years of the new Ninety and One Ten ranges.
- 3,258 cc V8 Petrol: The ex-Buick all alloy V8 engine appeared in the Range Rover right from the start of production in 1970, but did not make its way into the company's utility vehicles until 1979.
- 2,495 cc petrol, overhead valve: The final development of Land Rover's ohv petrol 'four', with hardened valve seats which allow running on unleaded (or LPG).
- 2,495 cc diesel, overhead valve, type 12J: Land Rover reworked the old 'two and a quarter' diesel for the 1980s. The injection pump was driven off a toothed belt at the front of the engine (together with the camshaft), a change compared with the older diesels.
- 2,495 cc turbodiesel, overhead valve, type 19J
- 2,495 cc turbodiesel, overhead valve, 200TDi and 300TDi: Used in the Defender and Discovery from 1990. The cylinder block was similar to the previous engine, although strengthened but the cylinder head was all-new and a direct injection fuel system was used.
- 2,495 cc turbodiesel, five-cylinder, TD5: An all-new engine for the second generation Discovery, and the Defender featuring electronic control of the fuel injection system, 'drive by wire' throttle, and other refinements
- The original Freelander models were available with various Rover K-series engines.
- In beginning of 2015 they start to use the all new Ingenium engine family, to replace Ford sourced engines.

As of August 2012, most Land Rovers in production are powered by Ford engines. Under the terms of the acquisition, Tata has the right to buy engines from Ford until 2019.

== Electric vehicles ==
Integrated Electric Rear Axle Drive (ERAD) technology, dubbed e-terrain technology, will allow the vehicle to move off without starting the engine as well as supplying extra power over tough terrain. Land Rover's Diesel ERAD Hybrid was developed as part of a multimillion-pound project supported by the UK Government's Energy Saving Trust, under the low carbon research and development programme. ERAD programme is one of a broad range of sustainability-focused engineering programmes that Land Rover is pursuing, brought together by the company under the collective name "e TERRAIN Technologies".

Land Rover presented at the 2008 London Motor Show its new ERAD diesel–electric hybrid in a pair of Freelander 2 (LR2) prototypes. The new hybrid system is being designed as a scalable and modular system that could be applied across a variety of Land Rover models and powertrains.

Land Rover unveiled the LRX hybrid concept at the 2008 North American International Auto Show in Detroit, for it to be going into production. An ERAD will enable the car to run on electric power at speeds below 20 mph (32 km/h).

In September 2011, the Range Rover Evoque was launched, though it was based on the LRX hybrid concept presented at the 2008 North American International Auto Show, it did not include the ERAD system, included in the original concept.

In February 2013, Land Rover unveiled at the 83rd Geneva Motor Show an All-Terrain Electric Defender that produces zero emissions. The electric vehicle was developed for research purposes following successful trials of the Defender-based electric vehicle, Leopard 1. The vehicle is capable of producing 70 kW and 330 Nm of torque and has a range of 80 kilometres or in low speed off-road use it can last for up to eight hours before recharging.

== Abilities ==
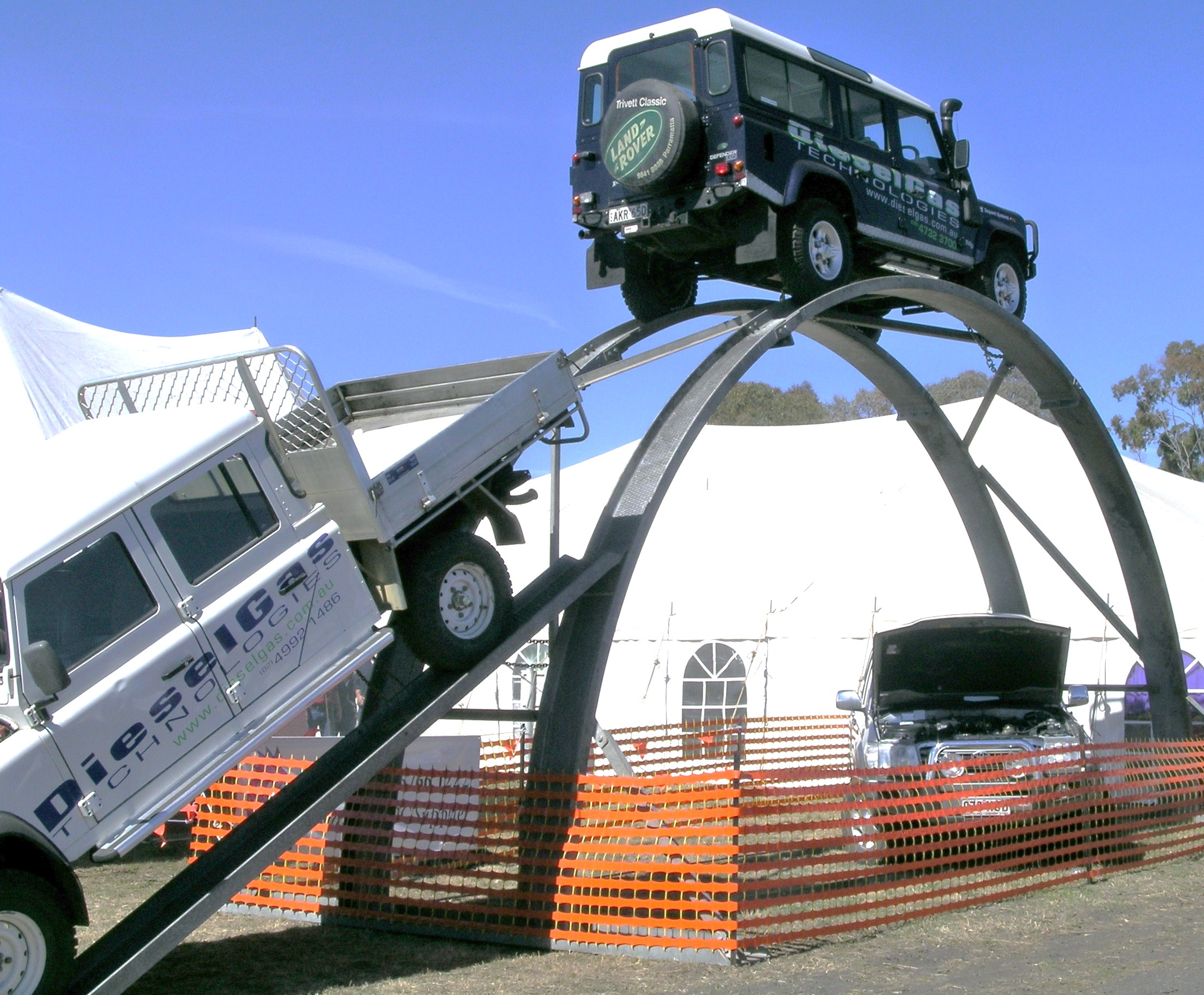
Land-Rovers at AgQuip, Gunnedah, Australia

Power take-off (PTO) was integral to the Land Rover concept from 1948, enabling farm machinery and many other items to be run with the vehicle stationary. Maurice Wilks' original instruction was "...to have power take-offs everywhere!" The 1949 report by British National Institute of Agricultural Engineering and Scottish Machinery Testing Station contained this description: "the power take-off is driven through a Hardy Spicer propeller shaft from the main gearbox output and two interchangeable pinions giving two ratios.

The PTO gearbox casing is bolted to the rear chassis cross-member and an 8 by 8 inches (200 mm × 200 mm) belt pulley driven from the PTO shaft through two bevel gears can be bolted to the PTO gearbox casing." PTOs remained regular options on Series I, II and III Land Rovers up to the demise of the Series Land Rover in 1985. An agricultural PTO on a Defender is possible as a special order.

Land Rovers (the Series/Defender models) are available in a variety of body styles, from a simple canvas-topped pick-up truck to a twelve-seat fully trimmed station wagon. Both Land Rover and out-of-house contractors have offered conversions and adaptations to the basic vehicle, such as fire engines, excavators, 'cherry picker' hydraulic platforms, ambulances, snowploughs, and six-wheel-drive versions, as well as one-off special builds including amphibious Land Rovers and vehicles fitted with tracks instead of wheels.

=== Military use ===
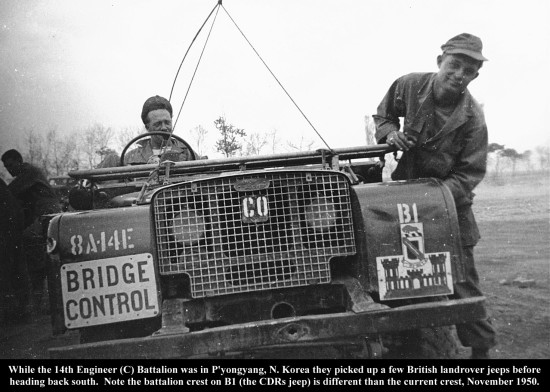
British Land Rover near Pyongyang, November 1950, during the Korean War

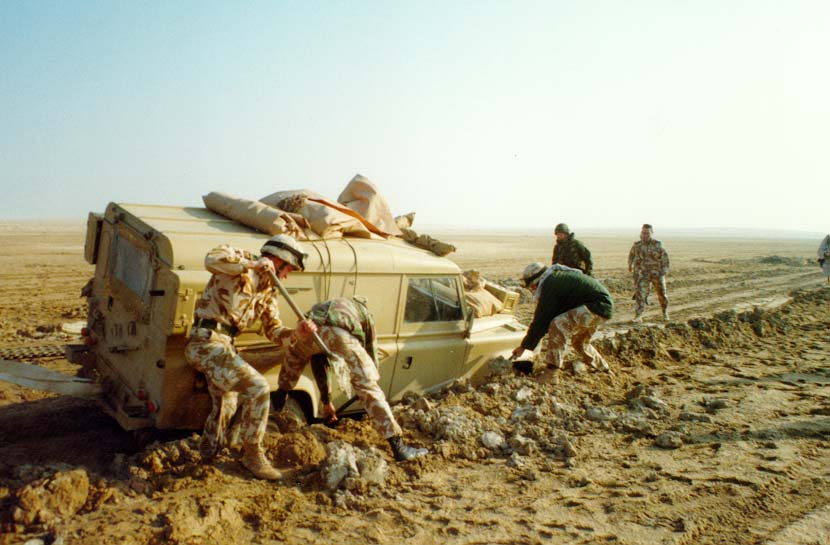
A mired Land Rover of the 1st Armoured Division being extracted during the Gulf War

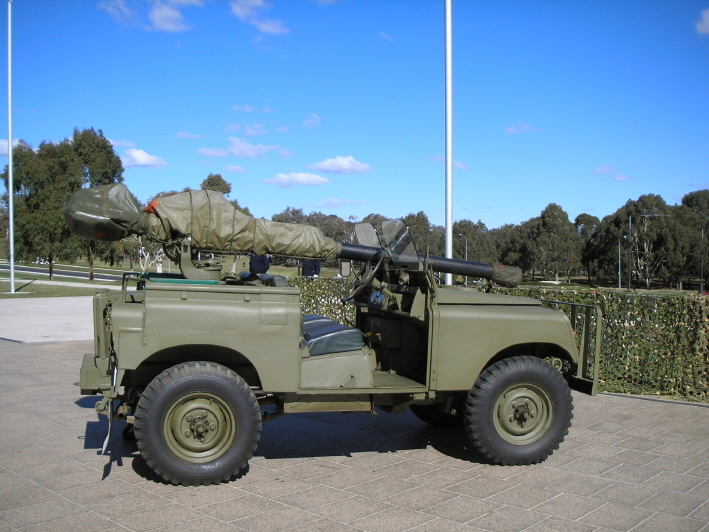
Ex-Australian Army Land Rover Series 2 "gunbuggy", with an M40 recoilless rifle used in the anti-tank role, at the Australian War Memorial

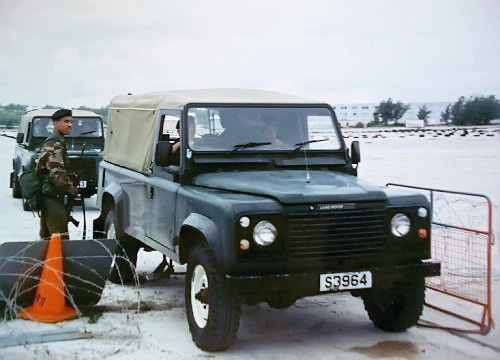
Defenders of the Bermuda Regiment, 1994

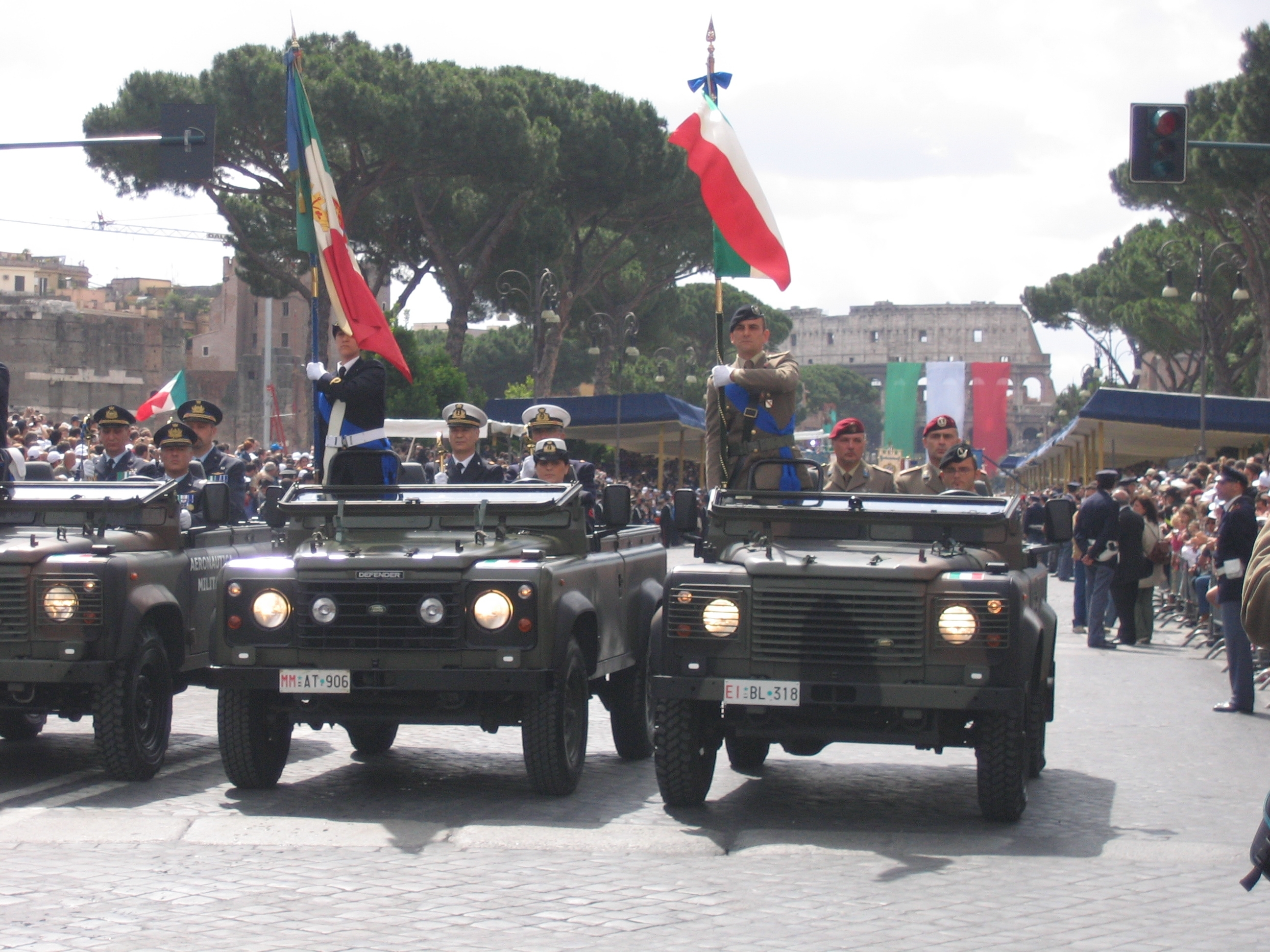
Land Rovers on parade with the Italian Army, Navy and Air Force, June 2007

Various Land Rover models have been used in a military capacity, most notably by the British Army and Australian Army. Modifications may include military "blackout" lights, heavy-duty suspension, uprated brakes, 24 volt electrics, convoy lights, electronic suppression of the ignition system, blackout curtains and mounts for special equipment and small arms. Dedicated military models have been produced such as the 101 Forward Control and the air-portable 1/2 ton Lightweight. Military uses include light utility vehicle; communications platform; weapon platform for recoilless rifles, Anti-tank (e.g. TOW or M40 recoilless rifle) / Surface-to-Air Guided Weapons or machine guns; ambulances and workshops. The Discovery has also been used in small numbers, mostly as liaison vehicles.

Two models that have been designed for military use from the ground up are the 101 Forward Control from the early 1970s and the Lightweight or Airportable from the late 1960s. The latter was intended to be transported under a helicopter. The Royal Air Force Mountain Rescue Service (RAFMRS) teams were early users in the late 1950s and early 1960s, and their convoys of Land Rovers and larger military trucks are a sight often seen in the mountain areas of the United Kingdom. Originally RAFMRS Land Rovers had blue bodies and bright yellow tops, to be better seen from above. In 1981, the colour scheme was changed to green with yellow stripes. More recently, vehicles have been painted white, and are issued with fittings similar to civilian UK Mountain Rescue teams.

An adaptation of Land Rovers to military purposes is the "Pink Panther" models. Approximately 100 Series IIA models were adapted to reconnaissance use by British special operations forces the SAS. For desert use they were often painted pink, hence the name. The vehicles were fitted with among other gear a sun compass, machine guns, larger fuel tanks and smoke dischargers. Similar adaptations were later made to Series IIIs and 90/110/Defenders.

The Australian Army adapted the Land Rover Series 2 into the Long Range Patrol Vehicle for use by the Special Air Service Regiment and as an anti-tank "gunbuggy" fitted with an M40 recoilless rifle.

The 75th Ranger Regiment of the United States Army also adapted twelve versions of the Land Rover that were officially designated the Ranger Special Operations Vehicle.

Series and Defender models have also been armoured. The most widespread of these is the Shorts Shorland, built by Shorts Brothers of Belfast. The first of these were delivered in 1965 to the Royal Ulster Constabulary, the Northern Ireland police force. They were originally 109-inch (2,800 mm) wheelbase models with an armoured body and a turret from the Ferret armoured car. By 1990, there had been more than 1,000 produced.

In the 1970s, a more conventional armoured Land Rover was built for the Royal Ulster Constabulary in Wales called the Hotspur. The Land Rover Tangi was built by the Royal Ulster Constabulary's own vehicle engineering team during the 1990s. The British Army has used various armoured Land Rovers, first in Northern Ireland but also in more recent campaigns. They first added protective panels to Series General Service vehicles, the Vehicle Protection Kit (VPK).

Later they procured the Glover Webb APV and finally the Courtaulds (later NP Aerospace) Composite Armoured Vehicle, commonly known as Snatch. These were originally based on heavy-duty V8 110 chassis but some have recently been re-mounted on new chassis from Otokar of Turkey and fitted with diesel engines and air-conditioning for Iraq. Although these now have more in common with the 'Wolf' (Defender XD) Land Rovers that many mistakenly confuse them with, the Snatch and the Wolf are different vehicles.

The most radical conversion of a Land Rover for military purposes was the Centaur half-track. It was based on a Series III with a V8 engine and a shortened belt drive from the Alvis Scorpion light tank. A small number was manufactured, and they were used by Ghana, among others.

The Land Rover is used by military forces throughout the world. The current generation of Land Rover used by British Army, the Snatch 2, have upgraded and strengthened chassis and suspension compared to civilian-specification vehicles. There is also the Land Rover WMIK (weapon mounted installation kit) used by British Army. The WMIK consists of a driver, a raised gun, usually a Browning heavy machine gun or a grenade machine gun, this used for ground support, and a GPMG (general-purpose machine gunner) located next to the driver, this used for vehicle protection.

=== Competitive use ===
Highly modified Land Rovers have competed in the Dakar Rally and won the Macmillan – UK Challenge almost every year, as well as having been the vehicle used for the Camel Trophy. Now, Land Rover has its own G4 challenge.

== Driver training ==
Land Rover Experience was established in 1990, and consists of a network of centres throughout the world, set up to help customers get the most out of their vehicles' on and off-road capability. The flagship centres are Land Rover's bases at Solihull, Eastnor, Gaydon and Halewood. Courses offered include off-road driving, winching and trailer handling, along with a variety of corporate and individual 'Adventure Days'. The factory centres at Solihull and Halewood have manufacturing tours, while Gaydon has an engineering tour.

== Safety ==
Model-by-model road accident statistics from the UK Department for Transport published in 2006 showed that the Land Rover Defender was one of the safest cars on British roads as measured by chance of death in two-car injury accidents. The figures, which were based on data collected by police forces following accidents between 2000 and 2004 in Great Britain, showed that Defender drivers had a 1% chance of being killed or seriously injured and a 33% chance of sustaining any kind of injury. Other four-wheel-drive vehicles scored equally highly, and collectively these vehicles were much safer for their passengers than those in other classes such as passenger cars and MPVs. These figures reflect the fact that drivers of large mass vehicles are likely to be safer, often at the expense of other drivers if they collide with smaller cars.

== Clubs ==
The original Land Rover Owners Club was set up by the Rover Company in 1954. The company published the Land Rover Owners Club Review magazine for members from 1957 to 1968 when the club became the Rover Owners Association. This original association fell away when the company merged with British Leyland.

There are many Land Rover clubs throughout the UK and internationally. Land Rover clubs break down into a number of groups of varying interests.

Single Marque Clubs – Bring together owners of a specific model or series of vehicle such as the Land Rover Series One Club, or the Discovery Owners Club. Single marque clubs have a global membership.

Special Vehicle Clubs – At various times Land Rover have produced vehicles for specific events or on a specific theme, most notable are the Camel Trophy and G4 Challenge vehicles which have been sold on to the general public, and a range of Defenders that were loosely based on the custom vehicles produced for the Tomb Raider motion picture.

Regional Clubs in the UK break down into two groups, competitive and non-competitive. The non-competitive clubs activities generally relate to social events, off-road driving or green laning on un-surfaced public highways or 'pay and play' days at off-road centres. Competitive clubs are a phenomenon almost exclusively found within the UK, who as well as the non-competitive activities detailed above run competitive events such as Tyro, Road Taxed Vehicle (RTV) and Cross Country Vehicle (CCV) trials, winch and recovery challenges or speed events such as Competitive Safaries. All UK competitive events are run within the framework of rules created by the Motor Sports Association (MSA) with further vehicle specific rules applied by the host club or association. Outside of the UK regional clubs are independent and mostly non-competitive.

A number of clubs are affiliated to the Association of Land Rover Clubs (ALRC); formerly known as the Association of Rover Clubs (ARC) the association applies its own vehicle regulations to all of its member clubs who have the opportunity to compete together at regional events and an annual national event with vehicles approved to the same standard. In recent years some non-competitive clubs have dropped their affiliation fifth ALRC. Few clubs outside of the UK are affiliated with ALRC. Other than ALRC and the short lived Association of North American Rover Clubs (ANARC), which was created 1998 to celebrate Land Rover's 50th anniversary and disbanded in 2001, other groups of Land Rover clubs have affiliated with each other.

Land Rover owners were also early adopters of virtual clubs that are entirely based online. Bill Caloccia created the original Land Rover Owner email list (LRO) as single marque offshoot of the British Cars email list in May 1990. Bill later created email lists in the mid-1990s for Range Rovers (RRO) and various regions (e.g., UK-LRO, AU-LRO, ZA-LRO, EU-LRO, IT-LRO, NL-LRO). In California members of the LRO list created mendo_recce in 1995.

In 2005, under Ford ownership, Land Rover became more interested in the club environment. An internal club was formed, The Land Rover Club, exclusive to employees of Ford's Premier Automotive Group (Now exclusive to the new 'Jaguar – Land Rover' group since the brand moved away from the Ford stable). Also, an agreement was generated to allow other clubs to use the Land Rover green oval logo under licence. In 2006, the Bedfordshire, Hertfordshire and Cambridgeshire club were the pilot licensees for the new agreement, who now benefit from a reciprocal arrangement where their own logo is trade marked and owned by Land Rover and they can refer to themselves as a 'Land Rover Approved Club'.

== Brand extensions ==
=== Bicycles ===
In 1995, Land Rover endorsed the production of a hand-made bicycle using its logo. The bicycle, called the Land Rover APB and manufactured by Pashley Cycles of Stratford-upon-Avon, was the collapsible version of Pashley Cycles' Moulton APB (All Purpose Bicycle) model, with leading link front suspension and adjustable damping and stroke. Two more models immediately followed: the Land Rover XCB V-20, aimed primarily at younger riders (children); and the Land Rover XCB D-26, also available as the M26 with hydraulic rim brakes, front suspension and suspension seat pillar.

In June 2004, Land Rover released a comprehensive 25 model range of bicycles. The three main ranges are the "Defender", the "Discovery", and the "Freelander", each with different attributes. The "Discovery" is an all-rounder bicycle suited to a variety of terrains, "Defender" is most suited to rugged terrain and off-road pursuits, whereas the "Freelander" is designed for an urban lifestyle. All bikes are made from lightweight aluminium.

In 2010 the range was relaunched in conjunction with British manufacturer 2x2.

=== Coffee ===
Land Rover has had its name associated with coffee since 2005, when the Land Rover Coffee company was established.

=== Pushchairs ===
Land Rover gave UK pram company Pegasus a licence to produce a three-wheeler range of Land Rover ATP pushchairs. The design reflected the heritage of the marque, with a light metal frame with canvas seating, held together with push-studs and tough simple parts like brakes and hinges. They could be collapsed completely flat, with wheels removed in seconds. The basic frame could be adapted with modules to allow a baby to lie flat or a bubble windscreen to completely enclose the child. The frame also came in long or short-handled versions, and could be repaired with home tools. The design was simple, light, and rugged and able to travel in all terrains (hence the ATP for all-terrain pushchair.) It came in three military looking colours: a light blue, a sand colour and olive drab. Production was discontinued in 2002.
