= Centre Steer =

1947 prototype for the first Land Rover

Land Rover Centre Steer

The Centre Steer is the name given by enthusiasts to the prototype of the Land Rover 4x4 automobile. Being a prototype, only one example was built and the production vehicle differed significantly in many ways. Developed in late 1947 by the Rover Motor Co., the Land Rover was intended to be an agricultural vehicle inspired by the wartime Willys Jeep.

== Design and build ==
Raw materials for car building were allocated by the government based on the company's export performance (as this earned much-needed trade revenue for post-war Britain). Because of this the Land Rover was designed from the outset to be exported to the British Empire and Commonwealth. Rover viewed this 4x4 as a stopgap to get production running and so the company could return to building luxury cars. The Land Rover had to be developed and produced with minimal outlay.

The prototype was produced in September 1947. Its most distinctive feature was the centrally mounted steering wheel, with passenger seats on either side. This was done for three reasons:

1. the Land Rover was designed as an agricultural vehicle capable of performing jobs also done by tractors. Tractors had centrally mounted steering and this system would be familiar to farmers;
2. with the drive in the centre of the vehicle, the space on either side could be used as additional storage space for cargo if the passenger seats were removed. The space could also be used for mounting equipment such as a generator or pump powered by the vehicle's Power Take Off (PTO) system from the main gearbox, which was under the seats;
3. the centre-steer layout removed the need to produce the vehicle in both right- and left-hand drive versions, saving money in production.

The vehicle shared the Jeep's 80 inch (2 m) wheelbase that would be carried over to the final production vehicle. It had more complex body panels, with a more curved front end and a Jeep-like rear body tub (the production vehicle used generally squarer, flatter panels for ease of production).

The Centre Steer used a Rover 1.6 litre 4-cylinder petrol engine of 50 horsepower (37 kW). This was coupled to a 4-speed manual gearbox from the Rover P3 saloon. This unit was coupled to a Willys/Ford 2-speed transfer gearbox taken from a Jeep. This not only allowed the selection of a lower set of 'crawler' gears but controlled the selection of drive to the front axle as well. The production 1948 Land Rover used the P3 gearbox, but an entirely different transfer box, designed and built by Rover, was fitted. This incorporated a Rover 'freewheel' mechanism to provide a permanent 4-wheel-drive system. The freewheel could be locked out to ensure full traction at both axles when off-road.

The Centre Steer was used as a concept of the basic design and mechanical elements and was used for promotional photographs for the first Sales Brochure, however these pictures were heavily airbrushed to resemble a normal early Land Rover. The pre-production vehicles quickly developed, without the central steering and complex body panels. The design team felt the centre steering was somewhat awkward to use and impractical in certain circumstances. The concept stayed in initial development drawings of the 'Land Rover' program in October 1947. However, by December 1947 the normal Land Rover had developed on the drawing board to be a conventional right- and left-hand drive vehicle.

The centre-steer vehicle was used off-road in and around Rover's Solihull works. Pictures exist of the vehicle seen ploughing and driving a threshing machine on a farm, though most of these photos are static publicity photographs.

Research in 2011 turned up some drawings of the Land Rover design between the Centre Steer and the normal Land Rover. An article on this vehicle, the 1947 Land Rover mockup, was in the Land Rover Register 1948 to 53 April 2011 Bulletin and shows that the Land Rover Mockup was initially drawn up with central steering.

== Present day status ==
It is not known if the Centre Steer prototype still exists. Many people, including most of the original design team, believe it was broken up shortly after production of the final Series I design started in 1948. Others say it was rescued and remains in some isolated farmyard barn waiting to be discovered. The discovery of the Centre Steer remains a 'Holy Grail' to many Land Rover enthusiasts. New research has revealed that the final Land Rover design was well advanced by early December 1947. The Centre Steer was left for use in publicity photographs that were used in the first sales brochure, though heavily air brushed to look like the production vehicle.

In 2004, a Land Rover enthusiast in the United Kingdom, Mr. Bill Hayfield, constructed a replica centre-steer vehicle after much study of remaining photographs of the original. The fully working vehicle demonstrated both the practicalities and drawbacks to the novel design. The replica used exactly the same engine and gearbox. The necessities of building such a vehicle in a home workshop also pointed towards ways the Rover company would have built their vehicle without complex pressing and cutting machinery-such as the creation of curves on the bodywork by cutting slots in a straight sheet, applying pressure to the metal, allowing it to bend at an angle allowed by the expansion slots, then welding up the slots to form a solid, strong body panel. Many previously speculated on the feasibility of constructing a centrally mounted steering system. Mr. Hayfield simply ran a chain drive from the steering column in the centre to the steering relay mounted under the left-hand wing, as used on the Jeep. The rest of the steering system was also the Jeep's recirculating ball and trackrod system.
