= Land Rover 101 Forward Control =

Light utility vehicle by Land Rover

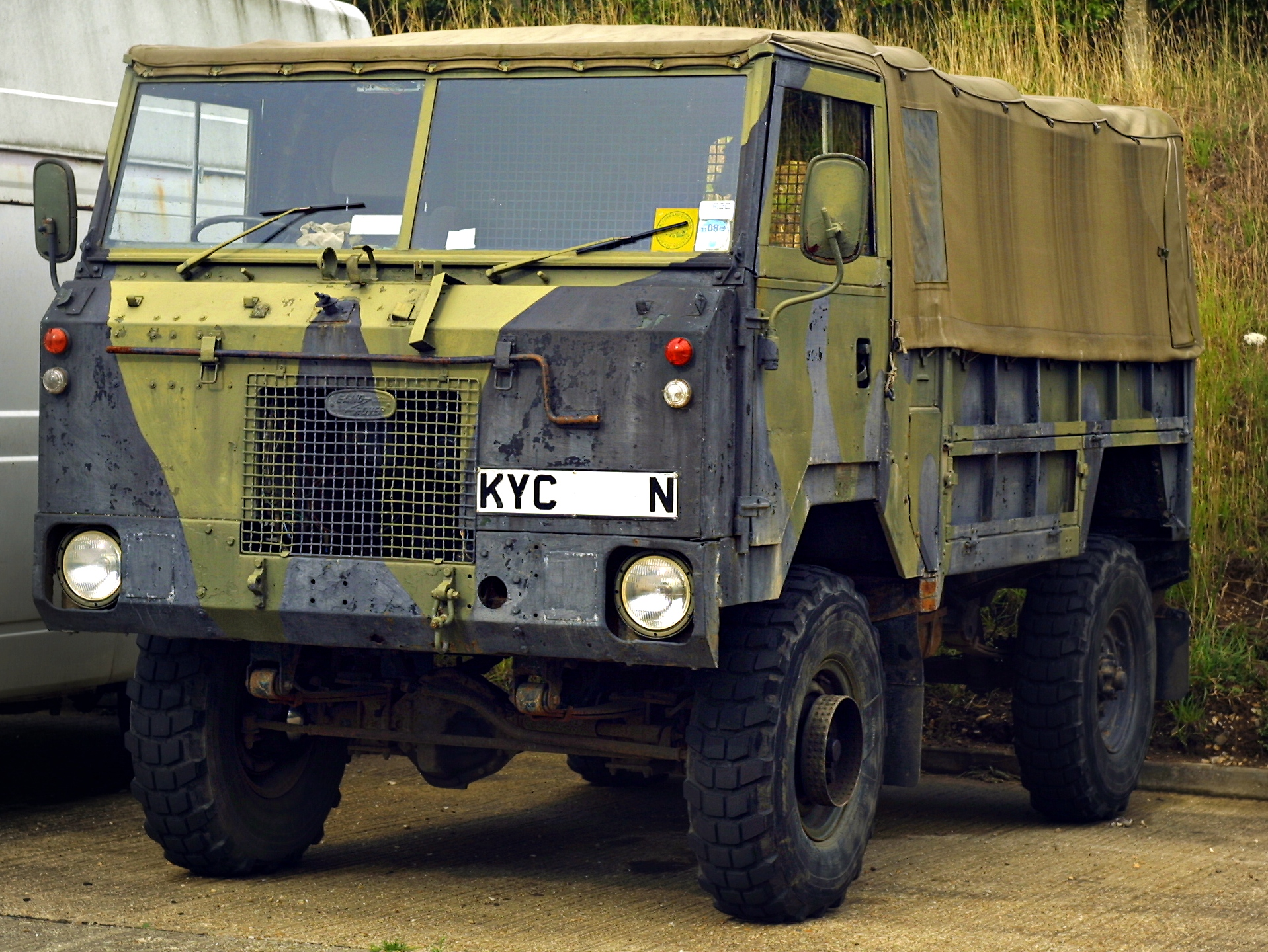
A civilian-owned 101 Forward Control or Land Rover 101FC

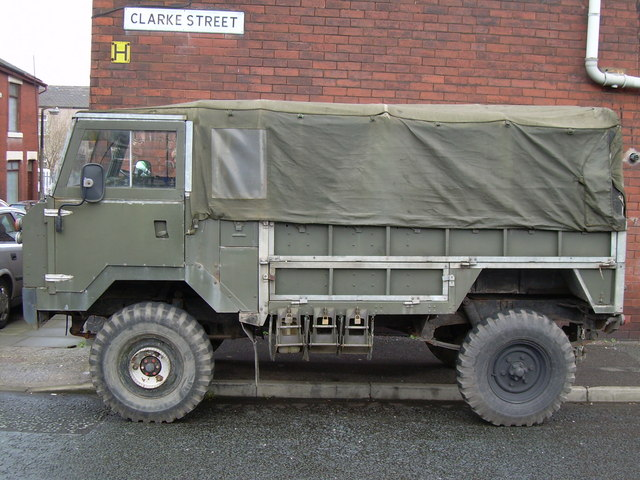
Side view of a Land Rover 101FC

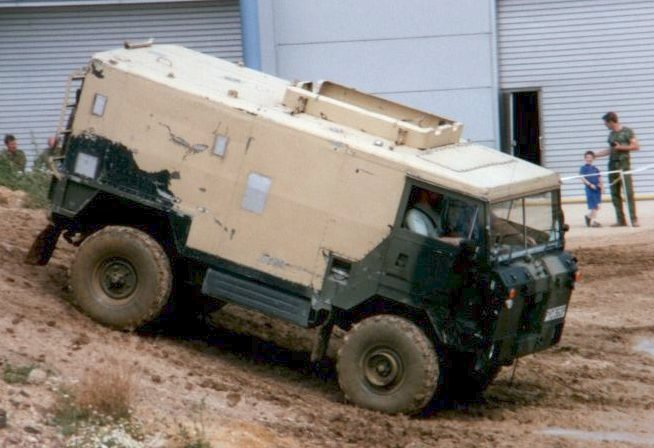
Land Rover 101FC in radio van body configuration

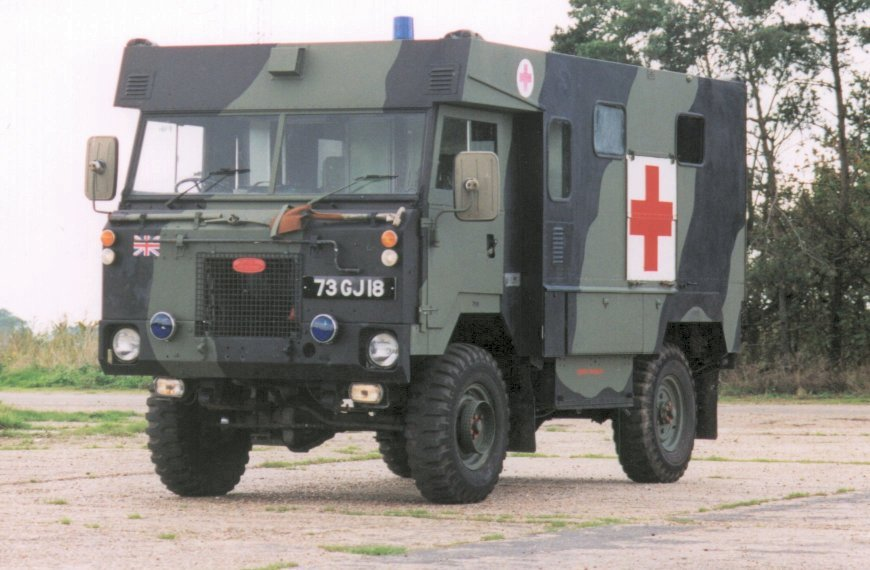
Land Rover 101FC with Marshall ambulance body

The 101 Forward Control or Land Rover 101FC was a light utility vehicle produced by Land Rover for the British Army. It was not available to the public off the production line, but was as military surplus.

== History ==
The vehicle was primarily produced to meet the Army's requirement for a gun tractor, and was designed to tow a field gun (the L118 Light Gun) with a ton of ammunition and other equipment in the rear load space, giving it the alternative name of the Land Rover One Tonne. The vehicle was designed to be easily transported by air; the positioning of the 3.5 litre Rover V8 engine beneath and to the rear of the cab eliminates the bonnet at the front, making the vehicle more or less cuboid thus reducing unused space in transport aircraft. Of concern was the payload and limited stability, particularly when crossing an incline.

The official name of 101 Forward Control is derived from the vehicle's 101-inch (2,565 mm) wheelbase, and the position of the driver, above and slightly in front of the front wheels which used a fairly large 9.00 × 16 inch tyre. To facilitate entry into the cab, the wheels carry a flange around the centre of the wheel with an embossed tread pattern as a step for the crew, named a wheel-step. This unusual feature was also used for many years on the Mercedes Unimog S404.

Development of the 101FC started in 1967, with a design team led by Norman Busby (14 October 1931 – 30 June 2005). Production took place between 1972 and 1978. In common practice of the armed forces, many vehicles were not used for some years and it is not unheard of for military vehicle enthusiasts to pick up these vehicles after only a few thousand miles service. All the vehicles produced at the Land Rover factory at Lode Lane, Solihull were soft top ("rag top") General Service (GS) gun tractors, although later on many were rebuilt with hard-top ambulance bodies and as radio communication trucks. A rare variant is the electronic warfare Vampire body. It is thought that only 21 of these were produced and less than half of these survive today. One was destroyed in the Buncefield Oil Terminal Fire.

The 101FC also served with the RAF Regiment. Two 101s were allocated to each Rapier Missile set up. The British RAF Rapier system used three Land Rovers in deployment: a 24V winch-fitted 101 Firing Unit Tractor (FUT) to tow the launch trailer, loaded with four Rapier missiles, guidance equipment and radio; a 12V winch-fitted 101 Tracking Radar Tractor (TRT) to tow the Blindfire Radar trailer, also loaded with four Rapier missiles and guidance equipment; and a 109 Land Rover to tow a reload trailer with 9 Rapier missiles and loaded with the unit's other supplies and kit.

The 101FC also served in an ambulance role, with ambulance bodywork built by Marshall of Cambridge. The 101FC was manufactured in both left and right hand drive with either 12 or 24 volt electrical systems.

Some 101FCs were produced with a PTO powered Nokken capstan winch mounted on the chassis at the centre of the vehicle, allowing winching from either the front or rear. Another variation on a small number of pre-production vehicles was the addition of a trailer with an axle driven from the PTO, creating a 6x6 vehicle, this adaptation was abandoned before full production when it was discovered that the trailer had a propensity to push the vehicle onto its side when driven over rough terrain.

On 5 September 1979 an open 101FC of the Life Guards Regiment carried the coffin of Louis Mountbatten, 1st Earl Mountbatten of Burma from his funeral at Westminster Abbey to Waterloo Station

=== Replacement ===
By the late 1990s, the 101s were decommissioned by the MoD and were replaced with Defenders and Pinzgauer vehicles. Many 101s have entered into private ownership and there is an owners club supporting these sourcing spares and providing technical support. The club also keeps a register of known surviving vehicles throughout the world.

A prototype 101 was built based on a recovery vehicle. Only one of these is known to be in existence, at the Heritage Motor Centre in Gaydon, Warwickshire.

== Australia ==
The Australian Army acquired fifty 101 vehicles, which were used to tow Rapier missile carriers. These 101s were disposed of and some of these remain in private hands.

== Use in film ==
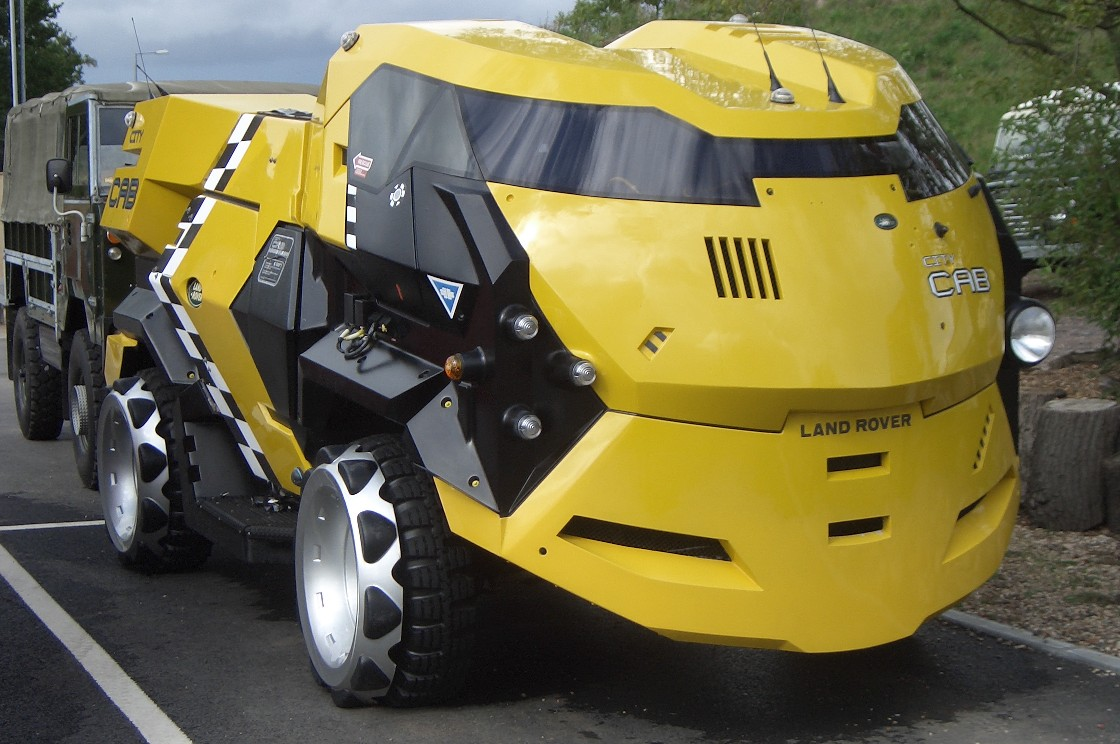
A 101FC re-styled for the film Judge Dredd

Thirty-one 101s were converted by Land Rover with styled bodyshells for the 1995 Sylvester Stallone film Judge Dredd. Land Rover is supposedly the world's only surviving ground vehicle manufacturer in 2139 when the film is set, and the green oval logo can be seen on the side of the vehicles, known as "City CABs". Several of these prop vehicles still exist in driveable condition and these can be seen at Land Rover events.

== Custom versions ==
In the 1990s, Malcolm Whitbread of Whitbread Offroad 4x4 obtained four examples of the 101. Three were right-hand drive; one was left-hand drive. The right-hand drive examples were extensively modified for trials or rally use. Modifications included conversion to a coil spring suspension system based on the Range Rover configuration of the time. Disc brakes were also fitted. The left-hand drive example (UK registration GDP 252V) was rebuilt with a hand-built custom chassis as a completely new vehicle. 15-inch wheels and power-assisted steering were included in the construction. GDP 252V was the only left-hand drive Land Rover 101 Forward Control to be registered as a new vehicle.

== See also ==
- Unimog
- Steyr-Puch Pinzgauer
- Jeep Forward Control
- UAZ-452
- GAZ-66
