= List of equipment of the Australian Army =

This is a list of the equipment currently used by the Australian Army.

== Individual equipment ==
=== Uniforms ===
Name	Image	Origin	Type	Notes
Tiered Combat Helmet (TCH)		United States	Combat helmet	The standard issue combat helmet of the Australian Army is the Team Wendy EXFIL Ballistic helmet designated the Tiered Combat Helmet (TCH). The EXFIL Ballistic was selected under Land 125 Phase 3B in 2015.
Australian Multicam Camouflage Uniform (AMCU)		Australia	Combat uniform	Standard issue combat uniform of the Australian Army. Its camouflage pattern is derived from Crye Precision MultiCam using a colour palette and shapes based on the previous Disruptive Pattern Camouflage Uniform (DPCU). The AMCU was initially issued in late 2014 to 3rd Brigade with a final design roll out commencing in January 2016.

=== Carbines, assault rifles and semi-automatic rifles ===
Name	Image	Origin	Type	Calibre	Notes
EF88 Austeyr		Australia	Bullpup assault rifle	5.56×45mm NATO	The Enhanced F88 (EF88) Austeyr is the ADF's standard individual weapon. The roll out of the EF88 to replace the F88 Austeyr began in 2016. The EF88 is manufactured in Australia by Thales Australia. The EF88 has a carbine variant. The ADF ordered 30,000 rifles and later 8,500 rifles. The EF88 can be fitted with the SL40 grenade launcher. Regular infantry battalions have suppressors.
M4 carbine		United States	Carbine	5.56×45mm NATO	Standard issue to special forces units. Its official designation in Australia is the M4A5.
HK416		Germany	Assault rifle	5.56×45mm NATO	Used by various special forces units.
F15		United States	Assault rifle	.300 Blackout	The SIG MCX is in service with either a 9" upper or a 5.5" upper, designated the F15, for "dismounted combatants" and will reportedly replace the Heckler & Koch MP5.
L1A1 Self-Loading Rifle		Belgium; United Kingdom; Australia	Semi-automatic rifle	7.62×51mm NATO	Used by the Australian Federation Guard with a bayonet attached for ceremonial purposes only.

=== Precision rifles ===
Name	Image	Origin	Type	Calibre	Notes
SR-98		United Kingdom	Bolt action sniper rifle	7.62×51mm	An Australian variant of the Accuracy International Arctic Warfare, it is the standard-issue sniper rifle in the Australian Army and is chambered for 7.62×51mm. It replaced the Parker Hale Model 82 rifle in the late 1990s. Manufactured under licence in Australia by Thales Australia. Under Land 300 Lethality Project, the SR-98 will be replaced by the Accuracy International AX-SR which will be designated the F18.
AW50F		United Kingdom	Anti-materiel rifle	.50 BMG	The AW50F is the largest-bore variant of the Arctic Warfare sniper rifles suited to the anti-materiel role. It is chambered for the .50 BMG cartridge, and is primarily used with NM140 HEIAP rounds. The AW50F was designed with an Australian-designed and manufactured barrel. It entered service in 2002.
Blaser 93 Tactical 2		Germany	Bolt action sniper rifle	.338 Lapua Magnum	A straight-pull bolt-action sniper rifle chambered in .338 Lapua Magnum. Used by special forces and infantry units.
HK417		Germany	Battle rifle	7.62×51mm NATO	"Marksman Rifle System" used by infantry and special forces units to fill the gap between a sniper rifle and 5.56mm derivatives. It entered service in 2011.
SR-25		United States	Semi-automatic sniper rifle	7.62×51mm NATO	A semi-automatic 7.62×51mm sniper rifle. In service with infantry and special forces units of the Australian Army. It has seen service in Iraq, Afghanistan and East Timor.
Mk 14 Enhanced Battle Rifle (M14 EBR)		United States	Designated marksman rifle	7.62×51mm NATO	Used by the Special Air Service Regiment.
Barrett M82A2		United States	Anti-materiel sniper rifle	.50 BMG	A semi-automatic sniper and anti-materiel rifle chambered in .50 BMG. Under LAND 300, the M82A2 will be replaced with the new and lighter M107A1 designated the F19.

=== Machine guns ===
Name	Image	Origin	Type	Calibre	Notes
F89A1 Minimi		Belgium	Light machine gun	5.56×45mm NATO	Light machine gun designated the Light Support Weapon (LSW) chambered for 5.56×45mm NATO. The F89 is also manufactured under licence in Australia by Thales Australia. Special forces units use the Para Minimi variant with a shortened barrel and sliding buttstock.
Maximi		Belgium	Light machine gun	7.62×51mm NATO	The 7.62×51mm NATO model of the Minimi designated the Maximi is also in limited service.
FN MAG 58		Belgium	General-purpose machine gun	7.62×51mm NATO	General purpose machine gun designated the General Support Machine Gun (GSMG) chambered for 7.62×51mm NATO. It replaced the M60 machine gun.
Browning M2HB-QCB		United States	Heavy machine gun	.50 BMG	Heavy machine gun mounted on vehicles.

=== Pistols ===
Name	Image	Origin	Type	Calibre	Notes
Self-Loading Pistol 9mm Mark 3		Belgium	Semi-automatic pistol	9mm	The Self-Loading Pistol 9 millimetre Mk.3 (Browning Hi-Power) is the standard issue service pistol of the Australian Defence Force. Under LAND 300, the Browning Self-Loading Pistol 9mm Mk.3 is being replaced by the F9 pistol.
F9 SWS		United States	Semi-automatic pistol	9mm	The F9 sidearm weapon system (F9 SWS) based on the SIG Sauer 9mm P320 X-Carry Pro features a Romeo 2 red dot sight and Foxtrot 2 white light torch. The Army began rolling out the F9 SWS in 2025 under LAND 300 to replace the Browning Self-Loading Pistol 9mm Mk.3.
Heckler & Koch USP SD		Germany	Semi-automatic pistol	9mm	The USPSD is used by special forces units.

=== Submachine guns ===
Name	Image	Origin	Type	Calibre	Notes
Heckler & Koch MP5		Germany	Submachine gun	9mm	Primarily used by special forces units in variants MP5K, MP5KA1, MP5A3 and MP5SD3. Under LAND 159, the SIG MCX in .300 Blackout calibre was selected as the Personal Defence Weapon to replace the MP5.

=== Shotguns ===
Name	Image	Origin	Type	Calibre	Notes
Remington Model 870 and 870P		United States	Shotgun	12-gauge	Used by both special forces and Military Police personnel. It is also used in specific roles within the infantry. Under LAND 159, the Benelli M3A1 will replace the Model 870.

=== Grenade launchers ===
Name	Image	Origin	Type	Calibre	Notes
SL40 GLA		Austria; Australia	Grenade launcher	40×46mm	Steyr GL40 side opening Grenade Launcher Attachment (GLA) manufactured by Lithgow Arms and designated SL40 for the EF88 rifle.
SL40 stand-alone		Austria; Australia	Grenade launcher	40×46mm	Steyr GL40 stand-alone frame variant manufactured by Lithgow Arms and designated SL40, fitted with a Daniel Defense DDM4 adjustable stock and Ergo AR15 grip.
M203		United States	Grenade launcher	40×46mm	Attaches to the F88 (RM Equipment M203PI) and M4 (Colt M203-A1) rifles. M203 PI entered service in 2001.
Mk 47 Striker LWAGL		United States	Automatic grenade launcher	40×53mm	Mk 47 Mod 1 Lightweight Automatic Grenade Launcher (LWAGL) fitted with Lightweight Video Sight (LVS2) sighting system. It replaced the Mk 19 AGL entering service in 2016.

=== Anti-armour ===
Name	Image	Origin	Type	Calibre	Notes
66mm Short-Range Anti-Armour Weapon (M72 LAW)		United States	Anti-tank rocket launcher	66mm	A single shot disposable anti-armour weapon.
84mm Carl Gustav Medium Direct Fire Support Weapon (MDFSW)		Sweden	Recoilless rifle	84mm	Primarily used in the anti-armour role. The Army operates the M3 version. The Army has purchased 600 of the latest version the M4 with first deliveries received in 2021. The M4 will be rolled out over five years. An M3 will be replaced when it reaches its ten-year life span. The Army has yet to procure a fire control system for the M4. The M2 version will be retained for training.
Javelin Anti-Tank Guided Missile (ATGM)		United States	Guided anti-armour missile	127mm	Prior to deploying to Afghanistan in 2001 the Special Air Service Regiment was equipped with the Javelin. It entered service in 2006 with infantry and cavalry units. In August 2025, the US approved a Foreign Military Sale of 161 Lightweight Command Launch Units (LWCLU) to Australia.

=== Mortars ===
Name	Image	Origin	Type	Calibre	Notes
M252A1 Mortar		United States	Mortar	81mm	176 M252A1 81 mm Lightweight Mortars were purchased together with the M32A1 Lightweight Handheld Mortar Ballistic Computer to replace the F2 81 mm mortar. The M252A1 entered service in 2019.
M224A1 Mortar		United States	Mortar	60mm	The M224A1 60mm Lightweight Mortar is used by special forces units and will be in service with 2 RAR amphibious light infantry battalion.

=== Grenades and anti personnel mines ===
Name	Image	Origin	Type	Detonation	Notes
F1 Fragmentation Grenade		Australia	Fragmentation grenade	Striker fuse	Manufactured by Thales Australia. It has a lethal radius of 6 m (20 ft), a casualty radius of 15 m (49 ft) and a standard delay time of 5 seconds. The F1 grenade has >4,000 2.4 mm (3/32 in) diameter steel balls embedded uniformly in the 62 g of RDX/Wax filling.
F2 Blast Grenade		Australia	Blast grenade	Striker fuse	An offensive grenade with no steel ball fragments. The F2 has an increased (110 g) RDX-based HE fill weight compared to the F1. The F2 provides the user a safer, and more predictable blast pattern, designed for use within confined spaces, specifically Close Quarters Battle.
A101 Series Coloured Smoke Grenade		Australia	Smoke grenade	Primer & delay	The A101 series smoke grenades are the current in service coloured smoke grenades, and are a set of four coloured smoke grenades for hand signalling in the battlefield, to mark drop zones, landing zones, or the location of friendly forces. The A101 series smoke grenades come in; Red (A111), Green (A121), Yellow (A131), Blue (A151).
M18A1 Claymore Anti-personnel Mine		United States	Anti-personnel mine	Remote – multiple methods	The Claymore is called an "Anti-Personnel Weapon".

=== Bayonets ===
Name	Image	Origin	Type	Notes
M7 Bayonet		United States	Bayonet	The Army acquired 30,000 M7 bayonets in the early 1990s.
M9 Bayonet		United States	Bayonet	The M9 is the Army's primary combat knife. The Army acquired more than 14,000 M9s in the early 1990s for attachment to the F88 Austeyr.

=== Combat knifes ===
Name	Image	Origin	Type	Notes
F7 Knife		Australia	Combat knife	The Zu Bladeworx H2HFW (Nomad Mk4) combat knife designated the F7 was rolled out in 2025 as part of the Land 300 Lethality Program.

== Armoured Vehicles ==
Name	Image	Origin	Type	Number	Notes
Armoured Combat Vehicles
M1A2 Abrams		United States	Main battle tank	46 (+29 on order)	Under LAND 907 Phase 2, the Army's 59 M1A1 tanks will be upgraded to the M1A2 through replacement. In January 2022, it was announced that the Army had ordered 75 M1A2 SEPv3 Abrams to be delivered from 2024. As of November 2024, the Army has received 46 M1A2 SEPv3, with four of these operational with 2nd Cavalry Regiment with the remaining ten to be delivered by the end of 2025.
ASLAV		Canada; Australia	Combat reconnaissance vehicle	257	Under LAND 400 Phase 2 the ASLAV is slated to be replaced by a new Armoured Reconnaissance Vehicle (ARV), the Boxer.
Boxer CRV		Germany; Netherlands; Australia	Combat reconnaissance vehicle	25 (+186 on order)	In August 2018, the Army ordered 211 vehicles with deliveries commencing in September 2019. Part of the LAND 400 Phase 2 program. The project includes the option for 11 additional ambulance variants. As of February 2024, the Army had 25 Boxer CRV in service.
M113		United States	Armoured personnel carrier	431	The Army has two upgraded M113 versions the M113AS3 and the lengthened M113AS4 in seven variants. The Army had operated 431 upgraded M113s. In 2022, 28 M113AS4s were donated to Ukraine. Oryx claims a logistics vehicle variant was donated. Under Land 400 Phase 3, the upgraded M113s were to be replaced by up to 450 Infantry Fighting Vehicles (IFVs) and 17 Manoeuvre Support Vehicles. However, by April 2023 the number of planned replacements had been successively reduced to only 129 units. In July 2023 the AS21 'Redback' was selected to replace the M113 fleet.
Armoured Engineering
M88A2 Hercules		United States	Armoured recovery vehicle	13 (+6 on order)	Seven M88A2 Recovery Vehicles were purchased in 2007 to support the M1 Abrams tanks. Another six were purchased and entered service in 2017. The Army has ordered six new M88A2s to be delivered from 2024.

== Utility, reconnaissance and support vehicles ==
Name	Image	Origin	Type	Number	Notes
Bushmaster PMV		Australia	Infantry mobility vehicle	763 (+405 on order)	The ADF received a total of 1,015 Bushmaster Protected Mobility Vehicles, with deliveries commencing in December 2004 for the Army and the RAAF. The Army acquired 11 Self Protection Adaptive Roller Kits (SPARK) mine roller Mark 2 (SMR2) under Project NINGAUI for the Bushmaster. In May 2023, an order for 78 Bushmasters was placed to replace the 90 Bushmasters donated to Ukraine in 2022. In July 2024, an order for 15 Bushmasters was placed to support the High Mobility Artillery Rocket System (HIMARS). In January 2025, an order was placed for 44 Bushmasters to support the second long-range fires regiment. In April 2026, an order was placed for 268 "next generation" Bushmasters. As of November 2023, the Army had 763 Bushmasters available to use.
Hawkei PMV		Australia	Armoured car	1,098 (inc. Air Force)	The ADF ordered 1,100 Hawkei Protected Mobility Vehicles - Light (PMV-L) to partially replace the Land Rover Perentie. It is smaller and around half the weight of the Bushmaster. It is able to be carried underslung by the CH-47F Chinook helicopter. As of August 2025, all 1098 Hawkei are in service with the ADF (two Hawkei were sold back to the manufacturer Thales Australia). The Hawkei has a weapons ring mount capable of being equipped with several weapon types including a 12.7mm machine gun or a 40mm automatic grenade launcher.
G-Wagon		Germany	Multi-purpose/light assault vehicle	2,268 (inc. Air Force)	The ADF has purchased a total of 2,268 G-Wagons that have partially replaced the Army's Land Rover Perenties. There are ten G-Wagon variants including several 6x6 variants.
RMMV HX		Germany	Tactical military trucks	3,580 (inc. Air Force)	The Army operates a fleet of armour protected and unprotected Rheinmetall MAN trucks. The ADF ordered 2,536 trucks under Project Land 121 Phase 3B. The first trucks were delivered to the Army in April 2016 and entered service in February 2017. The 40M replaced the Unimog. The HX77 replaced the Mack. The HX81 replaced the S-liner. The 42M is used for medium recovery and the 45M is used for heavy recovery. About 40 percent of the trucks have armour protection. In 2018, the ADF ordered a further 1,044 medium and heavy trucks under Project Land 121 Phase 5B.
HMT Extenda		United Kingdom	High mobility transporter	106	The Army purchased 31 HMT Extenda MK1 Nary patrol vehicles for use by the Special Air Service Regiment to replace the Long Range Patrol Vehicle to provide armoured protection from IEDs. Its namesake comes from Warrant Officer David Nary who was killed during pre-deployment training in Kuwait for the Iraq War. In addition, 89 HMT Extenda MK2 have been ordered for the 2nd Commando Regiment that will be reconfigurable in four configurations. In 2023, 14 HMT Extenda MK2s were donated to Ukraine. In 2026, the Chief of Army said the HMT was in service with special forces units and 1st Brigade. (Note: The 1st Brigade unit equipped with the HMT was the 5/7 RAR infantry battalion.)
DAGOR		United States	Light assault vehicle		The DAGOR (Deployable Advanced Ground Off-road) is used by special forces units. An undisclosed number of DAGOR vehicles worth A$22 million were ordered in 2024. In 2026, they were reported as having been delivered, including to the 5/7 RAR infantry battalion.
High Mobility Engineer Excavators (HMEE)		United Kingdom	Backhoe loader	8	The Army acquired eight JCB HMEEs under Project NINGAUI.
HUSKY Mark III		South Africa	Vehicle-mounted mine detection	12	The Army acquired twelve HUSKY Mark 3s under Project NINGAUI with eight fitted with a Ground Penetrating Radar (GPR) and four fitted with an Interrogation Arm (IA).
John Deere 450J bulldozers		United States	Bulldozer	21	The Army acquired 21 John Deere 450J bulldozers to replace the fleet of Caterpillar D3C bulldozers.

== Artillery ==
Name	Image	Origin	Type	Number	Notes
M777 howitzer		United Kingdom; United States	155mm towed howitzer	48	35 155mm M777A2s were ordered as part of the first phase of the Land 17 project to replace the Army's inventory of towed artillery, with initial deliveries beginning in late 2010. An additional 19 guns were purchased in late 2012 and delivered by early 2017 instead of the self-propelled guns previously planned. Ammunition used include the SMArt 155 round and the M982 Excalibur guided round. In 2022, Australia donated six M777s to Ukraine as aid in the Russian invasion of Ukraine.
AS9 Huntsman		South Korea	155mm self-propelled howitzer	6 (+24 on order)	Under LAND 8116 Phase 1, the Army will acquire 30 AS9 Huntsman based on the South Korean Hanwha K9 Thunder to be built in Geelong in Victoria. The first live firing of a AS9 Huntsman in Australia took place in December 2025 at Puckapunyal. The AS9 entered service in 2026 with all AS9s expected to be in service by 2028.
AS10		South Korea	Armoured Ammunition Resupply Vehicles	1 (+14 on order)	Under LAND 8116 Phase 1, the Army will acquire 15 AS10 Armoured Ammunition Resupply Vehicles (AARV) to be built in Geelong in Victoria. The AS10 entered service in 2026 with all AS10s expected to be in service by 2028.
M142 High Mobility Artillery Rocket System		United States	M30A1 Guided Multiple Launch Rocket System	8 (+34 on order)	42 High Mobility Artillery Rocket Systems (HIMARS) were ordered in 2023. The first eight were delivered in 2025. Twenty are scheduled to be delivered in 2026. All forty-two HIMARS are scheduled to be delivered by 2028. First firings in July 2025. In April 2026, the first Australian-made GMLRS rockets were test-fired by a HIMARS.

== Air defence ==
Name	Image	Origin	Type	Number	Notes
NASAMS-3		Norway	Short range ground based air defence system	7	The 16th Regiment will operate two enhanced National Advanced Surface to Air Missile System (NASAMS) batteries by the end of 2026. Each battery will consist of three fire units. The first live fire of NASAMS was conducted by the Army in 2023.

== Aircraft ==
Name	Image	Origin	Type	Number	Notes
AgustaWestland AW139		Italy; United Kingdom; Europe	Utility helicopter	1	The Army operates 1 AW139 leased from Toll as a Crash Response Helicopter based in Darwin for the 1st Aviation Regiment.
Bell B412EP		United States	Utility helicopter	2	2 under lease from Toll as Crash Response Helicopters based at the Army Aviation Training Center.
Boeing AH-64E Apache		United States	Attack helicopter	8 (+21 on order)	As of November 2026, 8 Boeing AH-64E Apache Guardians have been delivered from an order of 29 to replace the Tiger ARH. The Tiger Armed Reconnaissance Helicopter (ARH) fleet was retired from service on 30 September 2026. The Army is expected to receive all Apache aircraft by 2029.
Boeing CH-47F Chinook		United States	Heavy lift helicopter	14	The Chinook can be armed with the 7.62×51mm FN MAG 58 general-purpose machine gun and the 7.62×51mm M134D Minigun. In 2015, seven new CH-47Fs entered service with the Army. In March 2016, an urgent order was placed for three additional CH-47Fs. In 2021, the Army received a further two CH-47Fs and a further two again in 2022. (see also Boeing CH-47 Chinook in Australian service)
Eurocopter EC135		France; Germany; Europe	Training helicopter	15 (jointly with Navy); 5 (Army)	The Helicopter Aircrew Training System (HATS) of the Joint Helicopter School within the Navy's 723 Squadron at HMAS Albatross operates 15 EC135 T2+ helicopters jointly with the Army. In 2024, it was announced that the Army would operate 5 H135 (EC135 T3) 'Juno' helicopters at the Oakey Army Aviation Centre. The H135s have been leased from the UK Ministry of Defence for a period of five years. In December 2024, the Army commenced operating the H135s.
Sikorsky UH-60M Black Hawk		United States	Medium lift/utility helicopter	19 (+21 on order)	As of April 2026, 19 UH-60M Black Hawks have been delivered from an order of 40 that will replace the retired MRH-90 Taipan. The first UH-60Ms were delivered in July 2023. The Army is expected to receive all UH-60Ms by 2030.

== Unmanned aerial systems ==
Name	Image	Origin	Type	Number	Notes
PD-100 Black Hornet		Norway	Reconnaissance and battlefield surveillance		The Black Hornet entered service in 2014 for test and evaluation. In 2017, the Army ordered more than 160.
A61 Integrator		United States; Australia	Reconnaissance and battlefield surveillance		Under LAND 129 Phase 3, the Army is acquiring 24 Integrators to replace the RQ-7B Shadow 200. The Integrator first entered service in 2024–25 and all are expected to be delivered by the end of 2025. The Integrator is built in Australia including using Australian-designed components such as the CM234 Spitfire camera gimbal and Warden Hyperspectral Optical Radar.
RQ-12A Wasp AE		United States	Reconnaissance and battlefield surveillance		The Wasp entered service in 2014 for test and evaluation. The Wasp AE entered service in 2018. Under DEF129-SUAS, the WASP is to be replaced by the Quantum-Systems Vector.
Teal 2		United States	Reconnaissance and battlefield surveillance		The Red Cat Teal 2 was unveiled to the public in the United States in April 2023.

== Watercraft ==
Name	Image	Origin	Type	Number	Notes
LARC-V		United States	Amphibious cargo vehicle	15	15 medium size coastal / inland waterway landing craft fitted with 2 x 12.7mm HMG to be in service until 2027. Under LAND 8710 Phase 1B, the LARC-Vs will be replaced by 15 Amphibious Vehicles – Logistics (AV-L).
LCM-8		United States	River boat and mechanized landing craft	12	12 to remain in service until 2027. Withdrawn from service in 1993 and reintroduced in 1998 after upgrade. Under LAND 8710 Phase 1A, the LCM-8s will replaced by the Littoral Manoeuvre Vessel – Medium (LMV-M).

== Future equipment ==
=== LAND 159 ===
The Lethality System Project – LAND 159 is a Defence project that will equip the ADF with next-generation weapon systems, along with, related ancillaries, ammunition, facilities and training and support. The project was originally named LAND 159 and was renamed the LAND 300 Dismounted Combat Programme to incorporate two other LAND projects.

In July 2020, NIOA was selected as the Prime contractor to deliver Stage 1 of Tranche 1 to approach market and identify and evaluate the Tranche 1 capabilities: the ADF Sniper System and the Close Combat System. The ADF Sniper System consists of a medium-range anti-personnel sniper, a long-range anti-personnel sniper, an anti-materiel sniper, a sniper surveillance capability and a ‘Sniper Soldier Combat Ensemble'. The Close Combat System consists of a Hand-To-Hand Fighting Weapon System, a sidearm weapon system, Personal Defence Weapon (PDW) system, a combat shotgun system and an assault breeching system.

In September 2022, Defence announced that the following Tranche 1 weapons had been selected:

- Hand-To-Hand Fighting Weapon System: ZU Bladeworx Double-Edged Fighting Knife;
- Combat shotgun system: the Benelli M3A1 to replace the in service Remington 870;
- Sidearm Weapon System: SIG Sauer P320 XCarry Pro to replace the ageing Browning Hi-Power
- Personal Defence Weapon System: SIG Sauer MCX in .300 Blackout (.300 BLK)
- Assault Breaching System: Ensign-Bickford Aerospace & Defense's Rapid Wall Breaching Kit (RWBK)
- Long range sniper capability: Accuracy International AX-SR multi-calibre (in .338 Lap Mag, .300 Norma Mag and 7.62mm NATO)
- Anti-Materiel Sniper Capability: Barrett M107A1 in .50 BMG to replace the in-service M82A1
- Sniper Surveillance Capability: The Safran JIM Compact Multispectral Binoculars

In September 2022, NIOA was selected as the Prime Contractor for Stage 2 of Tranche 1 signing a contract to work with local and international suppliers and weapon manufacturers on the acquisition, integration, delivery and ongoing support of the new weapon systems selected earlier in stage 1, from 2023.

=== LAND 156 ===
The LAND 156 counter-drone project has ordered an "individual soldier anti-drone capability" the semi-automatic Genesis Arms GEN-12 12-gauge shotgun. Also, a US$6.9 million order was placed with DZYNE for an undisclosed number of Dronebuster (DB4) handheld counter-drone systems in July 2026.

=== Artillery ===
Under LAND 8113, the Army will acquire 42 M142 High Mobility Artillery Rocket Systems (HIMARS) to provide fire support up to 300 kilometres (190 mi). The munitions the Army will procure include: M30A1, M30A2, M31A1, M31A2 and XM403 Guided Multiple Launch Rocket Systems (GMLRS) and the M57 Army Tactical Missile System (ATACMS). The HIMARS will incorporate a weapon locating radar from CEA Technologies. The government implemented the April 2023 Defence Strategic Review recommendation that LAND 8113 Phases 2-4 be accelerated and expanded. In July 2024, the government placed an order for 15 Bushmaster vehicles to be used for the command and control of HIMARS. In March 2025, the Army received the first two HIMARS with all 42 scheduled to be delivered by 2028. In September 2025, the US approved a Foreign Military Sale of a further 48 HIMARS to Australia.

Under LAND 8116 Phase 1, the Army will acquire 30 AS9 Huntsman 155mm self-propelled howitzers based on the South Korean Hanwha K9 Thunder together with 15 AS10 Armoured Ammunition Resupply Vehicles (AARV) to be built in Geelong in Victoria. Under Land 8116 Phase 2, the Army would have received additional Huntsmans to form a second regiment. The government implemented the April 2023 Defence Strategic Review recommendation to cancel Phase 2. In December 2024, batch 1 consisting of 2 AS9s and 1 AS10 built in South Korea, arrived in Australia. The first live firing of a AS9 Huntsman in Australia took place in December 2025 at Puckapunyal. The first three Australian produced AS9 Huntsman were completed in February 2026. The AS9 and AS10 entered service in 2026.

In 2017, NIOA and Rheinmetall were selected as the prime contractors for LAND 17 Phase 1C.2 - Future Artillery Ammunition program to supply the Australian Army a suite of advanced Assegai 155mm munitions. The program has also re-established a domestic forging capability with a shell forging factory in Maryborough, Queensland as joint venture through Rheinmetall NIOA Munitions (RNM), with first rounds being produced in 2022, and exports in 2023. The Assegai fleet was chosen for a number of factors, including increased safety with the choice of insensitive HE rounds, enhanced lethality, extended range, and higher precision. This accomplished by ballistically matched rounds, requiring no change in firing tables when firing different capabilities, allowing faster more accurate follow up fire, in addition all rounds are fitted with a boat-tail assembly that can be replaced for a base-bleed unit increase the maximum range by 30% (which is over 30 km for the 39-calibre M777A2 in service). The Assegai fleet being acquired includes: conventional HE, Insensitive Munition High Explosive (IHE), IHE Pre-Fragmented (PFF), Smoke, Visual and Infrared illumination and Extended Range Velocity Enhance (V-LAP), practice and inert projectiles; propelling charges, fuzes and boat tail and base bleed tail assemblies. The Assegai ammunition is qualified for use in all NATO 39 and 52 calibre 155mm guns. The first delivery of Assegai ammunition occurred in 2019.

=== Anti-ship ===
Under LAND 8113 Phase 2, (Note: "LAND 8113 Phase 2 - Second Long Range Fires Regiment merges all remaining phases of LAND 8113 and includes LAND 4100 Phase 2 Land Based Maritime Strike".) a deployable land-based anti-ship missile capability will be acquired. Kongsberg Defence Australia and Thales Australia offered the StrikeMaster a Naval Strike Missile system based on the Bushmaster Protected Mobility Vehicle utility variant. Lockheed Martin offered the M142 HIMARS system with the Precision Strike Missile Increment 2 which has "a multi-mode seeker to engage moving and maritime targets".

The Defence Strategic Review released in April 2023 recommended that the program be accelerated and expanded. In January 2025, the government placed an order for 44 Bushmaster vehicles to be used for the command and control of the new missile system. In April 2026, the Australian government announced that it had selected the M142 HIMARS system with the Precision Strike Missile.

=== Air defence ===
Under LAND 19 Phase 7B, the RBS 70 Short Range Ground Based Air Defence system will be replaced by the enhanced National Advanced Surface to Air Missile System (NASAMS), with CEA Technologies Active Electronically Scanned Array (AESA) radars, and the AN/AAS-52 Multispectral Targeting System (MTS-A). The system comprises a CEA Operational (CEAOPS) AESA search radar, fitted on a Rheinmetall HX77 truck, a 5m telescoping mast and housing mounted on a Hawkei PMV, and a Kongsberg Fire Distribution Centre (FDC), mounted on a HX40M truck together with a Mk2 canister launcher. The system also has a smaller, mobile CEA Tactical (CEATAC) AESA fire-control radar fitted to a Hawkei PMV, and a high-mobility launcher (HML) fitted to the Hawkei PMV. The Mk2 canister launcher and the high mobility launcher will be configured to launch the AIM-120C-7 Advanced Medium-Range Air-to-Air Missile (AMRAAM). An initial order of two batteries, consisting of a number of canisters and/or HML, a MTS-A EO/IR, FDC and a CEATAC; was placed in June 2019 with initial operational capability scheduled for 2022–23.

=== Armoured vehicles ===
Under LAND 121 Phase 4 in December 2011, the Thales Hawkei PMV (Protected Military Vehicle) was selected as the preferred tender for the Army's requirement of a light 4x4 armored car with a potential order for 1300 vehicles. The seven-tonne Hawkei has been described as a 'baby' variant of the Bushmaster having been developed by the same manufacturer.

Under LAND 400 the ASLAV and M113s will be replaced, with the project to acquire a Combat Reconnaissance Vehicle (CRV), an Infantry Fighting Vehicle (IFV), a Manoeuvre Support Vehicle (MSV) and an Integrated Training System (ITS). The ASLAV fleet is planned to be replaced from 2020, and the M113s from 2025. On 19 February 2015 the tender was opened for the replacement of the ASLAV, listing a requirement for up to 225 armored vehicles to provide the future mounted combat reconnaissance capability. The remaining requirements of the project will be confirmed by the upcoming Defence White Paper; however, it is expected to include an infantry fighting vehicle—a capability currently only partly provided by the in-service M113AS4 Armoured Personnel Carrier—as well as a manoeuvre support vehicle, and an integrated training system. The project has since been scaled back with a 2023 Defence Strategic Review announcement that the armoured vehicle acquisitions would be reduced to accommodate a quicker acquirement of the land-based anti-ship missile system amongst other projects.

Under LAND 907 Phase 2 the M1A1 Abrams will be upgraded to the M1A2 through replacement. In January 2022, the government announced that the Army will acquire 75 M1A2 SEPv3 Abrams and six M88A2 Hercules recovery vehicles which will be delivered from 2024. Under Land 8160 Phase 1, the Army is reviving the Combat Engineering Vehicle capability lost with the Leopard tanks and will acquire twenty-nine M1150 Assault Breacher Vehicles and seventeen M1074 Joint Assault Bridges to be delivered from 2024.

=== Aircraft ===
The Army is replacing its fleet of ARH Tiger attack and MRH-90 Taipan utility helicopters earlier than planned.

The ARH Tiger was scheduled to receive a A$1–2 billion mid-life upgrade in the late 2010s and was planned to be operated into the 2030s. The 2016 Defence White Paper stated the Tiger would be replaced in the mid-2020s and cancelled the mid-life upgrade instead the Tiger is to receive a A$500–750 million upgrade. In January 2021, under LAND 4503 Phase 1 the government announced that the Army will purchase 29 Boeing AH-64E Apache Guardian to replace the 22 Tigers from 2025. In June 2021, the US approved a Foreign Military Sale of AH-64E Apache attack helicopters to Australia. In September 2025, the first two AH-64E Apaches were delivered to the Army. In 2026, Defence announced in the 2026 National Defence Strategy that the Tiger ARH would be withdrawn from service by the end of 2026. On 30 September 2026, the Tiger ARH was retired.

In January 2014, the Army commenced retiring the fleet of 34 S-70A-9 Black Hawks from service and had planned for this to be completed by June 2018 to be replaced by 41 MRH-90 Taipans. The Chief of Army delayed the retirement of 22 Black Hawks until 2021 for the 6th Aviation Regiment due to issues operating the MRH-90 in a special operations role. On 10 December 2021, the Black Hawk was retired from service. On the same day, amid issues with the MRH-90 Taipans the Australian government announced that they would be replaced by UH-60M Black Hawks. The MRH-90 was planned to be retired in 2037. In August 2022, the US approved a Foreign Military Sale of 40 UH-60Ms to Australia. In January 2023, the Army announced under LAND4507 Phase 1 the acquisition of 40 UH-60Ms with deliveries commencing in 2023. In September 2023, the MRH-90 was retired from service earlier than originally planned following a fatal crash in July 2023 during Exercise Talisman Sabre in which four Australian Army aircrew lost their lives; this followed a previous, emergency ditching in March 2023, in waters off Jervis Bay due to an engine failure (likely caused by a software issue). The MRH-90 had been planned to be retired in December 2024. The first UH-60Ms were delivered in July 2023.

In 2021, the Army leased 2 AgustaWestland AW139s from Toll for the 5th Aviation Regiment under an Army Commercial Helicopter program due to issues with the MRH90 Taipan. The AW139s were to be used for aircrew training, exercises and civil emergency response. In 2023, the Army leased another AW139 from Toll for the 5th Aviation Regiment. In 2024, the Australian government announced that it would lease 5 H135T3 helicopters from the United Kingdom Ministry of Defence for five years to maintain "essential training requirements" for Army pilots. The helicopters designated Juno HT.1s in the UK will be based at the Oakey Army Aviation Centre. In December 2024, the Army commenced operating the H135s which replaced the 3 AW139s leased from Toll in Quarter 2, 2025.

=== Unmanned aerial systems ===
In May 2023, the Australian Defence Force ceased using Chinese made DJI drones because of security concerns. The Army had operated a fleet of DJI Phantom 4 drones since 2018. In January 2024, the Department of Defence's Advanced Strategic Capabilities Accelerator (ASCA) established the "Sovereign UAS Challenge" awarding 11 Australian companies a total of A$1.2 million to develop prototype drones.

Under DEF129-SUAS, formerly known as Land 129 Phase 4B, the Army will acquire the SYPAQ Corvo X Small Uncrewed Aerial System (SUAS) and the Quantum-Systems Vector 2-in-1 fixed-wing eVTOL small uncrewed aerial systems (SUAS). According to a March 2026 edition of Army News, the Vector will replace the in-service WASP and PUMA SUAS soon.

Under the Mission 6 Talon Strike initiative, the Army will receive the Australian made Innovaero One-Way Loitering-B (OWL-B) Munition in the first half of 2027. The electric-powered OWL-B has a 9 kg (20 lb) warhead, a range exceeding 200 km (124.27 mi), and will use the in service A61 Integrator launcher.

=== Watercraft ===
Under LAND 8710, the Army will replace its fleet of LCM-8s and LARC-Vs and also acquire two new types of watercraft. Two of the types: the Landing Craft – Medium (LC-M) which will replace the LCM-8, and the Littoral Manoeuvre Vessel – Amphibious (LMV-A) which will replace the LARC-V, were to enter service from 2026. The Defence Strategic Review released in April 2023 recommended that the acquisition of three of the types: the LC-M, the LMV-A, and the Landing Craft - Heavy (LC-H), be accelerated and expanded.

In Phase 1A, the LCM-8s will be replaced by the Landing Craft – Medium (LC-M) (previously referred to as the Littoral Manoeuvre Vessel – Medium (LMV-M)). The Army will acquire 18 LC-Ms which will be steel-hulled and have the capability to carry 80 tonnes of payload over 2,000 nautical miles (3,700 km; 2,300 mi) at sea state 4 and full payload 500 nautical miles (930 km; 580 mi) while retaining 20% fuel reserves. In November 2023, the Birdon Group LC-M design was selected to be built by Austal. In June 2025, ABC News reported that Austal had been awarded an interim contract to work with the Birdon Group on the LC-M design. In December 2025, Austal announced that it had been awarded a contract to both design and build the LC-Ms. The LC-M design will have a length of 55m, a beam of 10.5m, be able to carry a payload of 80 tonnes, and have a range of 1,200 nautical miles (2,200 km; 1,400 mi). Austal is scheduled to commence building the first craft in 2026 with the last craft scheduled to be delivered in 2032.

In Phase 1B, the LARC-Vs were to be replaced by up to 18 Littoral Manoeuvre Vessel – Amphibious (LMV-A). In January 2026, the Birdon Group was awarded a contract to design and build one prototype and 15 Amphibious Vehicles – Logistics (AV-L).

In Phase 2, the Army will acquire the Landing Craft - Heavy (LC-H) (previously referred to as the Littoral Manoeuvre – Heavy (LMV-H)). In November 2024, the Damen Shipyards Group design the Landing Ship Transport 100 (LST100) was selected. Eight vessels will be built by Austal with construction expected to commence in 2026.

In Phase 3, the Army will acquire an armed Littoral Manoeuvre Vessel – Patrol (LMV-P).

=== Summary ===
This list includes equipment currently on order or a requirement which has been identified:

- LAND 4503 Phase 1 replacement program is set to replace the Tiger ARH helicopter with the Boeing AH-64E Guardian helicopter.
- LAND 19 Phase 7B replacement program is set to replace the RBS-70 Short Range Ground Based Air Defence system with the National Advanced Surface to Air Missile System (NASAMS).
- LAND 4100 Phase 2 will acquire a deployable land-based anti-ship missile capability.
- The Bushmaster PMV in the 2016 Defence White Paper is to be replaced beginning in 2025 by a new platform.
- LAND 400 Phase 2 replacement program is set to replace the existing 257 ASLAVs with 211 Boxers.
- LAND 400 Phase 3 replacement program is set to replace 431 M113AS3/4 APCs with 129 Redback (IFVs)
- LAND 907 Phase 2 replacement program is set to replace 59 M1A1 Abrams with 75 of the M1A2 SEPv3 variants.
- LAND 8113 will acquire 42 M142 High Mobility Artillery Rocket Systems (HIMARS).
- LAND 8710 Phase 1A replacement program is set to replace the LCM-8 with the Landing Craft – Medium (LC-M).
- LAND 8710 Phase 1B replacement program is set to replace the LARC-V with the Littoral Manoeuvre Vessel – Amphibious.
- LAND 8710 Phase 2 will acquire the Landing Craft - Heavy (LC-H).
- LAND 8710 Phase 3 will acquire the Littoral Manoeuvre Vessel – Patrol.
- The Army has outlined in the 2016 Defence White Paper a need for enhanced intelligence, surveillance and reconnaissance capability. With this, they plan to acquire a fleet of armed, medium-range unmanned aerial vehicles along with regular capability updates. They will provide enhanced firepower and ISR as well as a counter-terrorism ability overseas. They will also assist in humanitarian and relief missions.
- LAND 8116 Phase 1 will acquire AS9 Huntsman 155mm self-propelled howitzers.
- LAND 4507 Phase 1 replacement program is set to replace the MRH-90 Taipan helicopter with the UH-60M Black Hawk helicopter.
