= Mack AC =

1916 American heavy truck

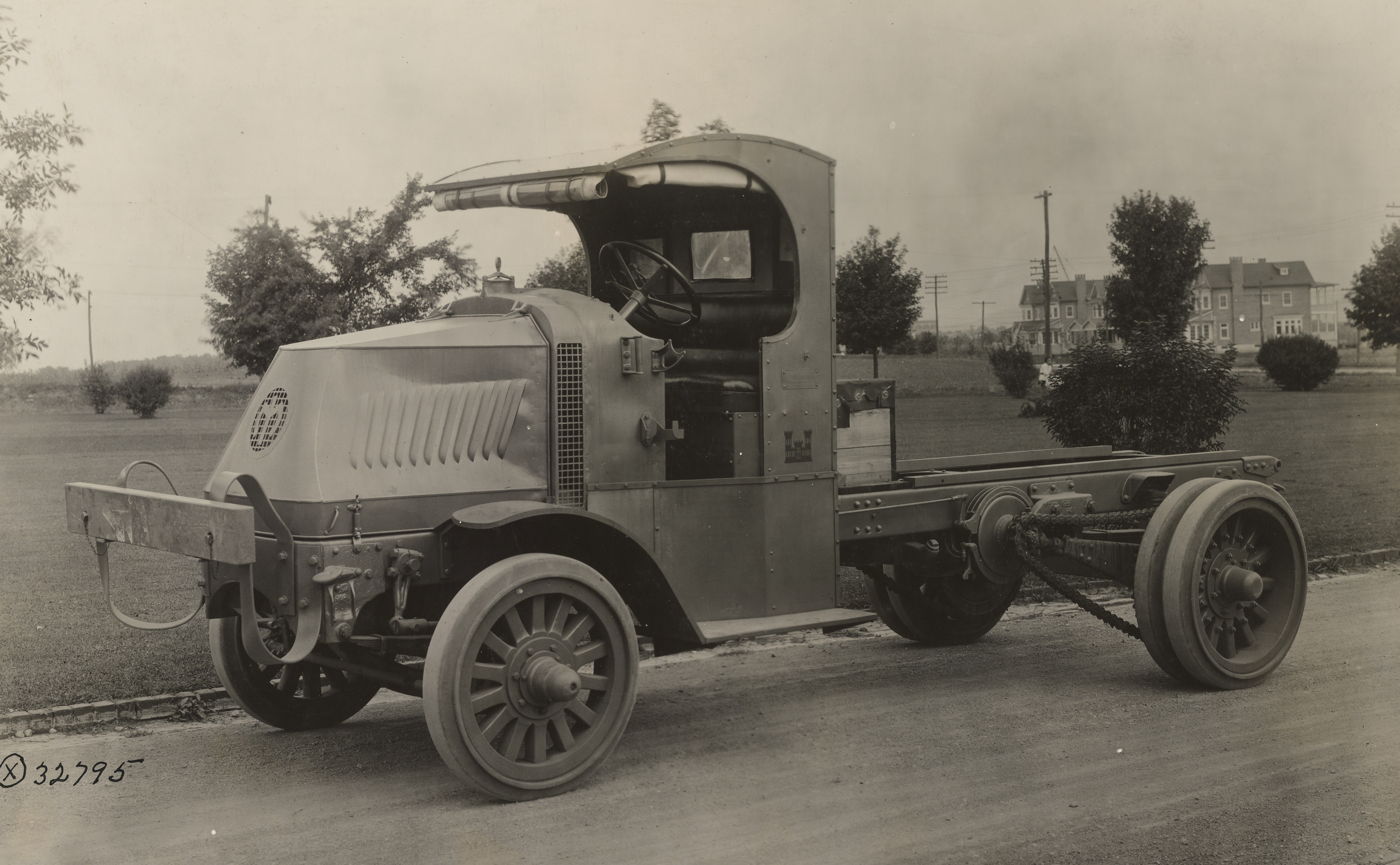
- A Mack AC in September 1918

Overview
- Manufacturer: Mack Trucks
- Also called: Bulldog
- Production: 1916–1938
- Designer: Edward Hewitt

Body and chassis
- Class: 3 1/2-ton, 5 1/2-ton or 7 1/2-ton

Powertrain
- Engine: 4-cylinder 74 bhp (55 kW) petrol
- Transmission: 3 speed selective with clutch brake
- Propulsion: 4x2

Chronology
- Predecessor: Mack Senior
- Successor: Mack BC

The Mack AC was a heavy cargo truck designed in the 1910s by Mack Trucks, an American truck manufacturer then based in Allentown, Pennsylvania. Introduced in 1916, the Mack AC saw extensive service during World War I with British and American armed forces. The British gave it nickname "Bulldog", which led Mack Trucks to adopt the bulldog as its corporate symbol.

== Development ==
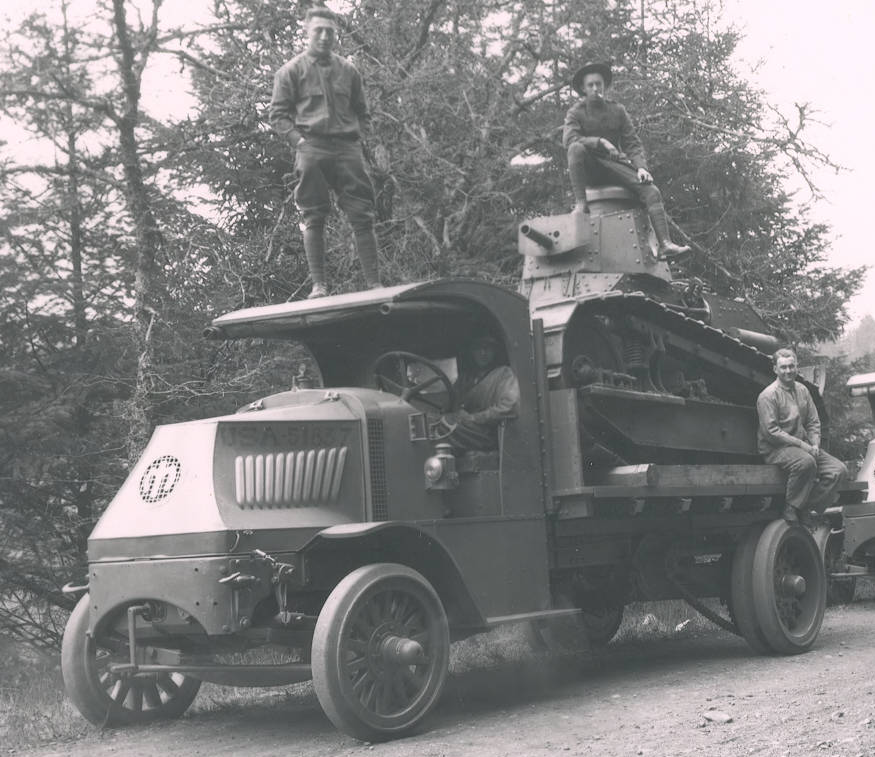
Mack AC carrying a M1917 light tank

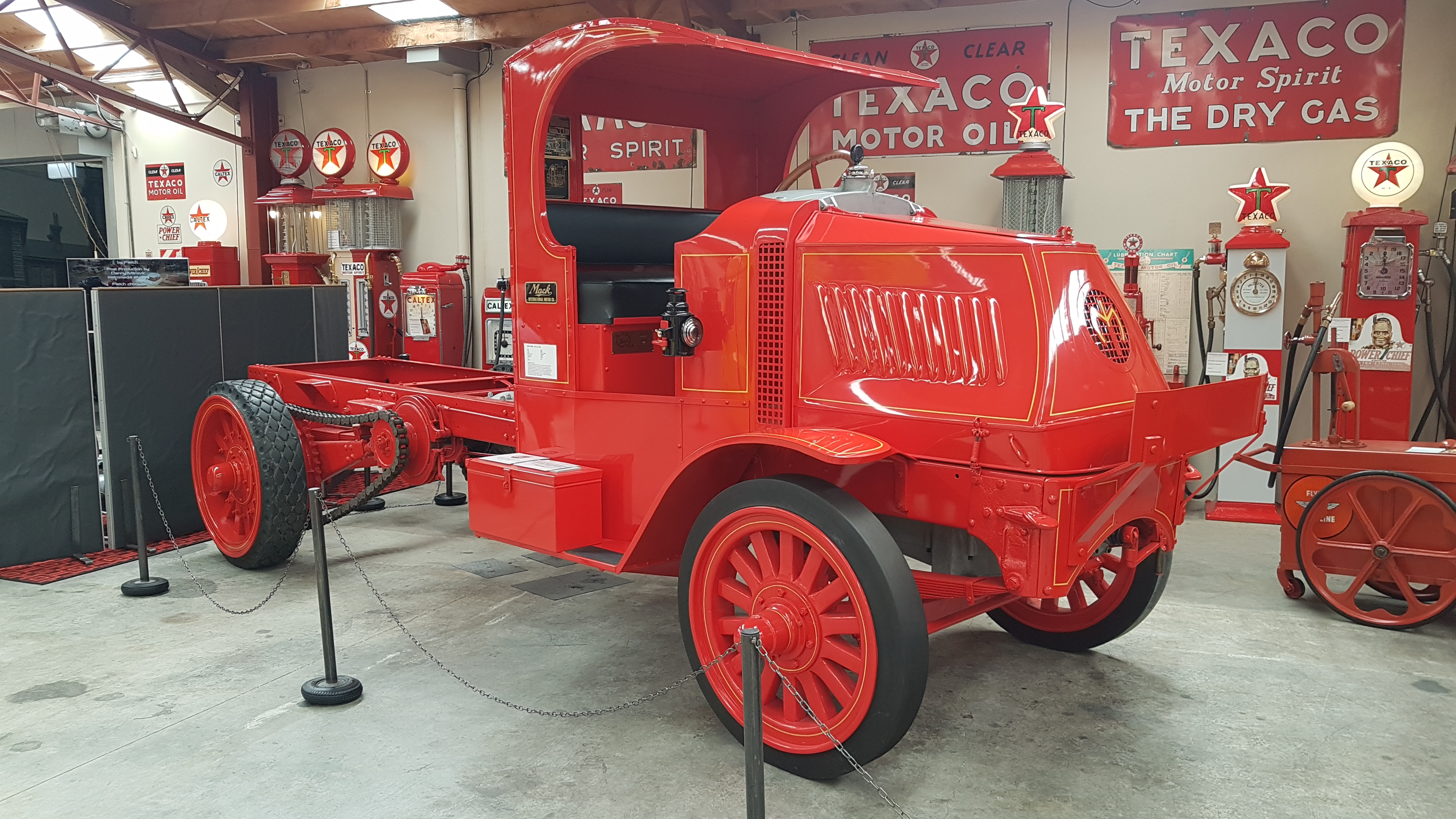
1918 5 1/2-ton Mack AC

Mack Trucks introduced the AC model in 1916 to replace their Mack Senior model which dated from 1905. Mack's chief engineer, Edward Hewitt, is credited with designing the AC which on its introduction was so innovative it had 18 patents on various aspects of its design. When introduced, the AC complimented the smaller AB, another Hewitt design, that was introduced in 1914 to replace Mack's older Junior model.

== Design ==
The AC was a two-wheel drive, two-axle truck which was made in three sizes, with payloads of 3 1/2 long tons (3.6 t), 5 1/2 long tons (5.6 t) and 7 1/2 long tons (7.6 t). The AC was powered by a pair-cast 4-cylinder petrol engine that delivered 74 brake horsepower (55 kW) (5x6 471.2ci). The engine had an aluminum crankcase which included inspection ports, and a governor built into the camshaft timing gear; it was driven through a three-speed transmission with a clutch brake. From 1936 Buda and Cummins diesel engines were also offered in the AC. One of the most distinctive features of the AC was its hood and dashboard mounted radiator (mounted behind the engine) (Note: It was believed mounting the radiator behind the engine protected it from damage caused by anti-truck lobbyists; the anti-truck lobby was led by US trade unionists who feared horse-drawn transportation would be displaced by motorized transport. Mack was not alone among US truck manufacturers to use dashboard mounted radiators: International, Kelly-Springfield and Lippard-Stewart did also, but the AC became the best known example due to its long life and wide distribution.) which was covered by a squared off bonnet of a coal scuttle pattern which had a small circular grille at the front containing the Mack emblem, all of which gave the model its distinctive appearance.

The AC's pressed chrome-nickel steel chassis was heat-treated for durability. Chain drive was used to drive the rear wheels while the front axle was made of drop-forged alloy steel for extra strength. Like most heavy trucks of the era, the AC used solid tires initially, although towards the end of its production run many were delivered with pneumatic tires. The AC had an all-steel cab with an optional metal roof. One innovation introduced in the AC was the positioning of the steering wheel at a 45-degree angle which greatly improved driver comfort.

=== Variants ===
The Mack AK was a shaft driven version of the AC, produced between 1927 and 1936. The Mack AP was a version of the AC with a 6-cylinder engine that was produced between 1926 and 1938. The AP was available in either four or six wheeled versions; the four-wheeler had a payload of 7 1/2 long tons (7.6 t), the six-wheeler a payload of 10 long tons (10 t) in rigid form and 15 long tons (15 t) as an articulated truck.

The Mack AL was a version of the AC model and designed specifically for distribution operations and firefighting equipment. This model differed by low mounted cabin and low frame height. Total of only 57 such vehicles were made, produced between 1927 and 1929.

== Use ==
The Mack AC saw extensive service with the militaries of the United States and the United Kingdom during the First World War. During the war Mack delivered approximately 4,500 ACs to the US government who adopted it as a standard type, using 3 1/2, 5 1/2 and 7 1/2 ton versions. Additionally, approximately 2,000 ACs were delivered to the British military during the war. It proved to be extremely popular in British service with British troops appreciating the AC's tough characteristics and reliability; the AC had a reputation for withstanding the roughest treatment and extreme overloading. British soldiers nicknamed the AC the "Bulldog", a reference to the model's tenacity and its stub nose, and the nickname was later also adopted by US troops. As a result of this nickname earned by the AC on the Western Front, all Mack trucks were often referred to as "Bulldogs", and in 1922 the company adopted the Bulldog as its corporate symbol.

The AC proved to be an extremely enduring model for Mack and it remained in production until 1938, with a total of 40,299 produced, along with 2,819 AKs and 285 APs. The AC was widely used in construction and road-building, with many used in the construction of the Hoover Dam. The AC was among the strongest trucks ever made, and solid-tire ACs built in the 1920s were still a common sight in American cities in the 1950s, and not unknown in the 1960s. The AC's chassis, along with that of the AP, was a popular choice for fire engines, in both rigid and articulated forms.

== See also ==
- Mack Trucks in military service
