= Long Range Patrol Vehicle =

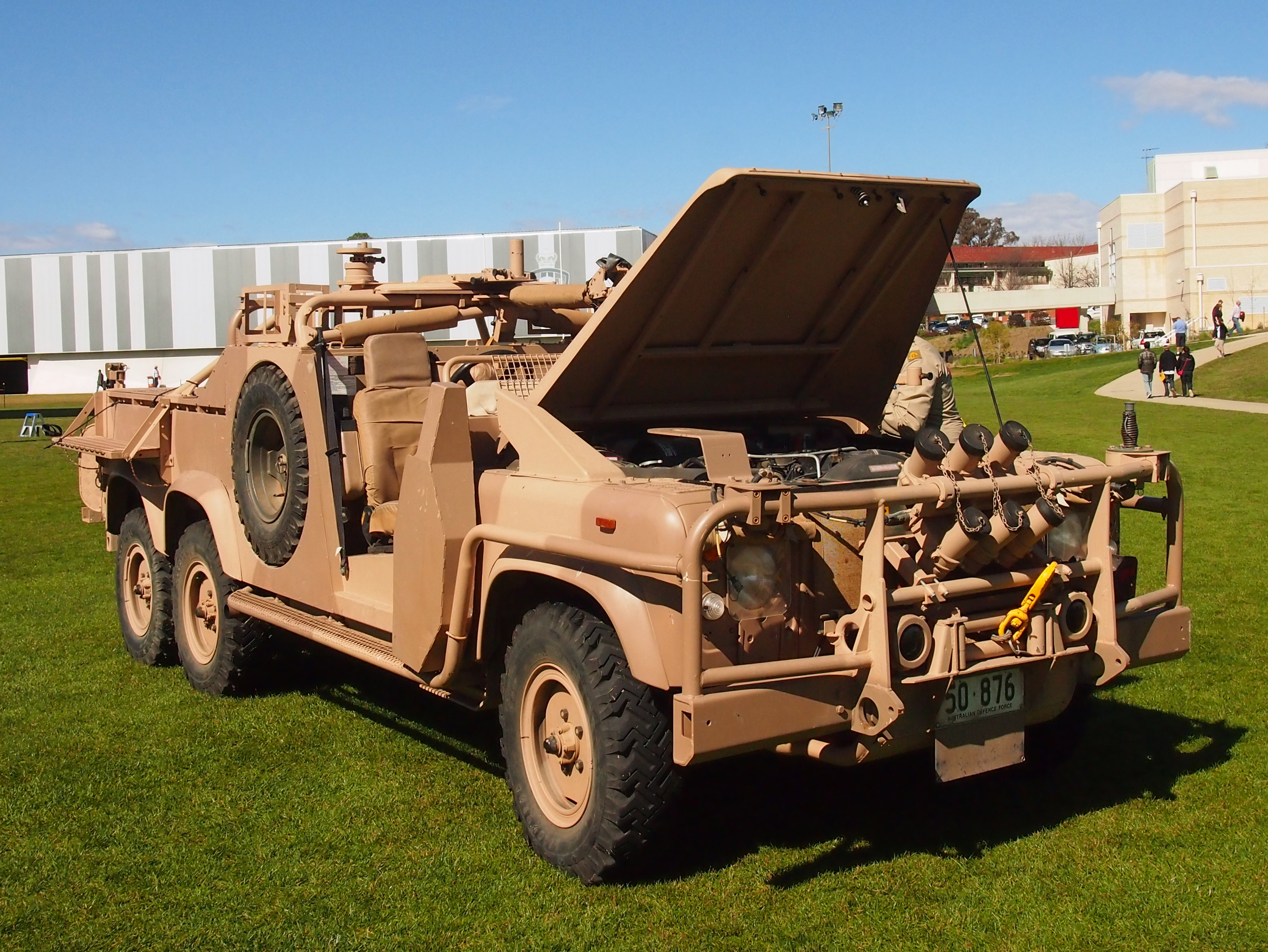
- A Long Range Patrol Vehicle on display at the Australian Defence Force Academy
- Type: Special Operations Vehicle
- Place of origin: Australia

Service history
- In service: Late 1980s–current
- Used by: Special Air Service Regiment
- Wars: Afghanistan (2001–2002)/(2006–2013); Iraq (2003)

Specifications
- Mass: 4840 kg
- Crew: 3
- Main armament: M2 Browning machine gun or Mk 19 grenade launcher
- Secondary armament: MAG 58 machine gun
- Engine: Isuzu turbo diesel 90 kW (120.69 hp)
- Power/weight: 3000rpm and 253 Nm of torque at 2500 rpm
- Operational range: 1,600 km (994.19 mi)
- Maximum speed: 59 mph (94.95 km/h)
- Steering system: Adwest power steering

The Long Range Patrol Vehicle (LRPV) is a 6x6 patrol vehicle that was used by the Australian Special Air Service Regiment (SASR) in Afghanistan and Iraq.

== Design ==
The SASR's first long ranged patrol vehicles were modified Series II Land Rovers. They were developed in the early 1970s and used in exercises in northern Western Australia from 1973.

The LRPV was developed from the six-wheel drive variant of the Australian Army's Land Rover Perentie design in the late 1980s. The design was intended to be used by the SASR to patrol remote regions of Australia. The LRPV is mechanically simple, and relatively easy to maintain in the field. It has a crew of three.

The LRPV is fitted with a central ring mount, which can be fitted with either a M2 Browning heavy machine gun or a Mk 19 automatic grenade launcher (AGL).

A MAG 58 medium machine gun is also commonly fitted in front of the passenger's (left-hand) seat. In addition, LRPVs can also carry a Suzuki DRZ 250cc motorbike on their tailgate to be used for scouting purposes.

== Service history ==
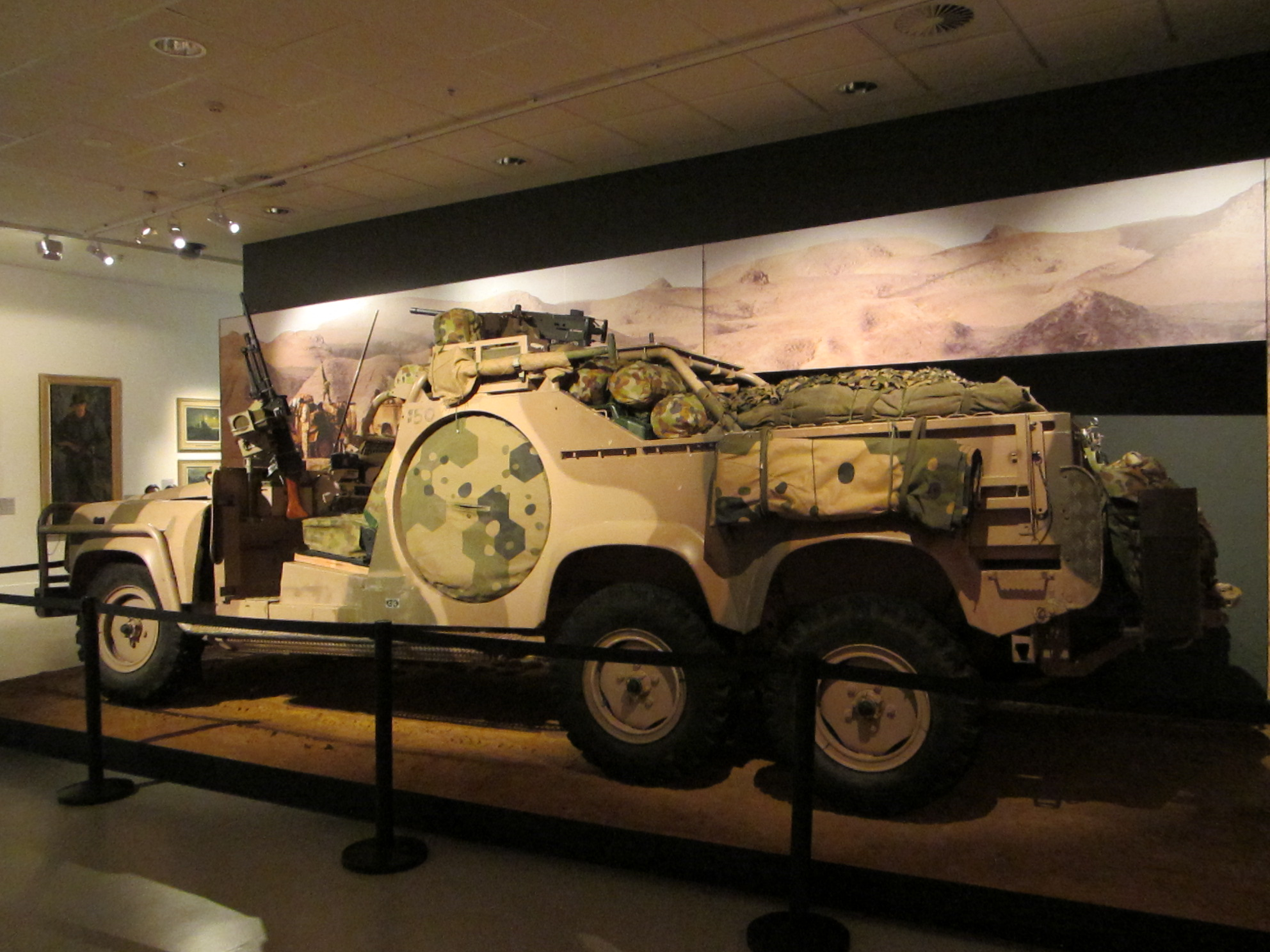
A LRPV on display at the Australian War Memorial. This vehicle struck a mine while deployed to Afghanistan.

The LRPV deployed to Kuwait in 1998 for Operation Desert Thunder, and first saw combat as part of the Australian contribution to the War in Afghanistan, Operation Slipper and later in Iraq in Operation Falconer.

The SASR's 1 Squadron arrived in Afghanistan in November 2001, and rapidly sent LRPV-mounted patrols hundreds of kilometers from their base at Camp Rhino. In his history of the SASR's early operations in Afghanistan, journalist Ian McPhedran wrote that the "Australian-designed LRPVs would prove ideal in the harsh Afghan environment, as they could stay on patrol for weeks on end without needing to return to base".

On 16 February 2002 SASR Sergeant Andrew Russell was killed when the LRPV he was travelling in struck a mine during an operation in the Helmand Valley. This was the first Australian fatality of the war, and Russell was the first member of the SASR to have been killed in action since the Vietnam War. The two other members of the vehicle's crew were wounded in this incident, and the LRPV was destroyed. As a result of this incident, all of the remaining LRPVs were fitted with a "Survival Enhancement Kit", which consisted of armour plating beneath the vehicle and shock-absorbent seats.

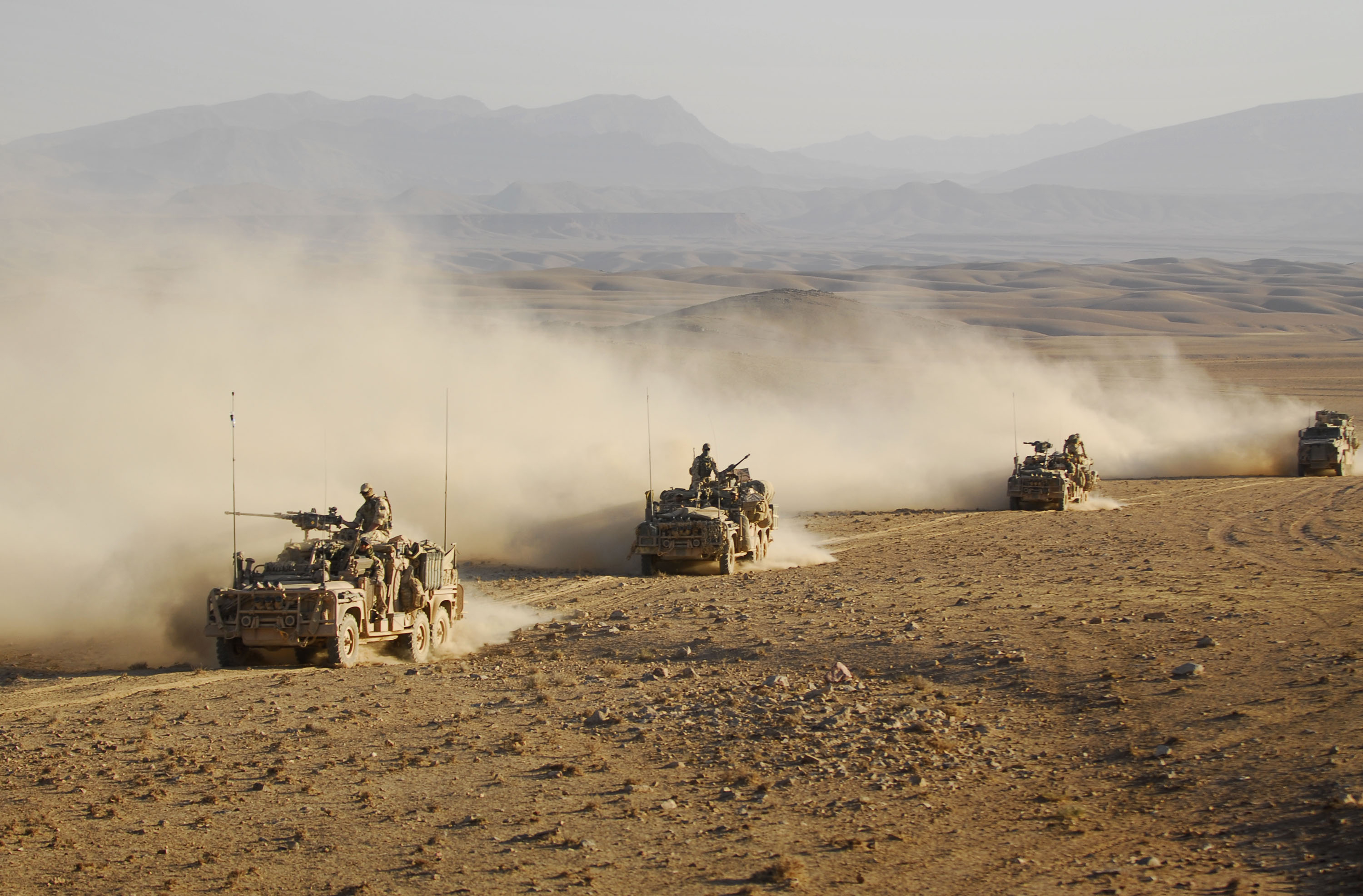
LRPV patrol in Afghanistan in October 2009.

In 2003, the SASR's 1 Squadron were one of the first special forces units to enter Iraq in the invasion, entering from Jordan, consisting of two troops with LRPVs crossing the border entering the western desert and a third troop with LRPVs inserted by U.S. helicopters over the border. Western Iraq had been divided into areas to patrol between the U.S. 5th Special Forces Group, the UK Special Air Service and the SASR. The SASR was equipped with FIM-92 Stinger Man-Portable Air-Defence Systems. The two troops who crossed the border conducted one of the first engagements of the war and the third troop inserted by helicopter was for several days the closest coalition element to Baghdad. The SASR also used the 2nd Commando Regiment vehicle designated the Surveillance Reconnaissance Vehicle (SRV) to supplement LRPV patrols. The SRV is a Land Rover Perentie 4x4 fitted with the same ring mount as the LRPV in the rear to enable the fitting of a M2 Browning machine gun or Mk 19 grenade launcher. It also has a passenger side front seat weapon mount for the MAG 58 machine gun.

The LRPV was later in the Afghanistan campaign, after Australia returned in 2006, patrolling regularly with the SRV, the Australian made Bushmaster armoured vehicle as well as Polaris six-wheel all-terrain vehicles, which could be fitted with a MAG 58 machine gun, and carry a M3 Carl Gustav recoilless rifle.

Coalition Special Operations had been using vehicles with the latest armour protected vehicle hull for many years, since 2003 the UK Special Air Service had been using the Supacat HMT 400 in Afghanistan and the same vehicle entered service with the US 1st Special Forces Operational Detachment-Delta in Afghanistan in 2004.

In 2008, the Bushmaster became the primary combat vehicle favoured over the LRPV.

In August 2008, Australia placed an order for 31 of the latest Supacat HMT vehicles, the Extenda configurable between 4x4 and 6x6, named the "Nary" for use in Afghanistan to replace the LRPVs for a cost of $80 million. The project to introduce these vehicles into service was delayed by three years due to problems integrating different systems onto the vehicles, but they reached their 'final operating capability' on 28 June 2012. Several Nary vehicles were deployed to Afghanistan.

== See also ==
- P6 ATAV
- VLEGA Gaucho/Chivunk
- FMC XR311
- Light Strike Vehicle (Singapore)
- General Dynamics Flyer
