= Land Rover Perentie =

Nickname for the Land Rover 110

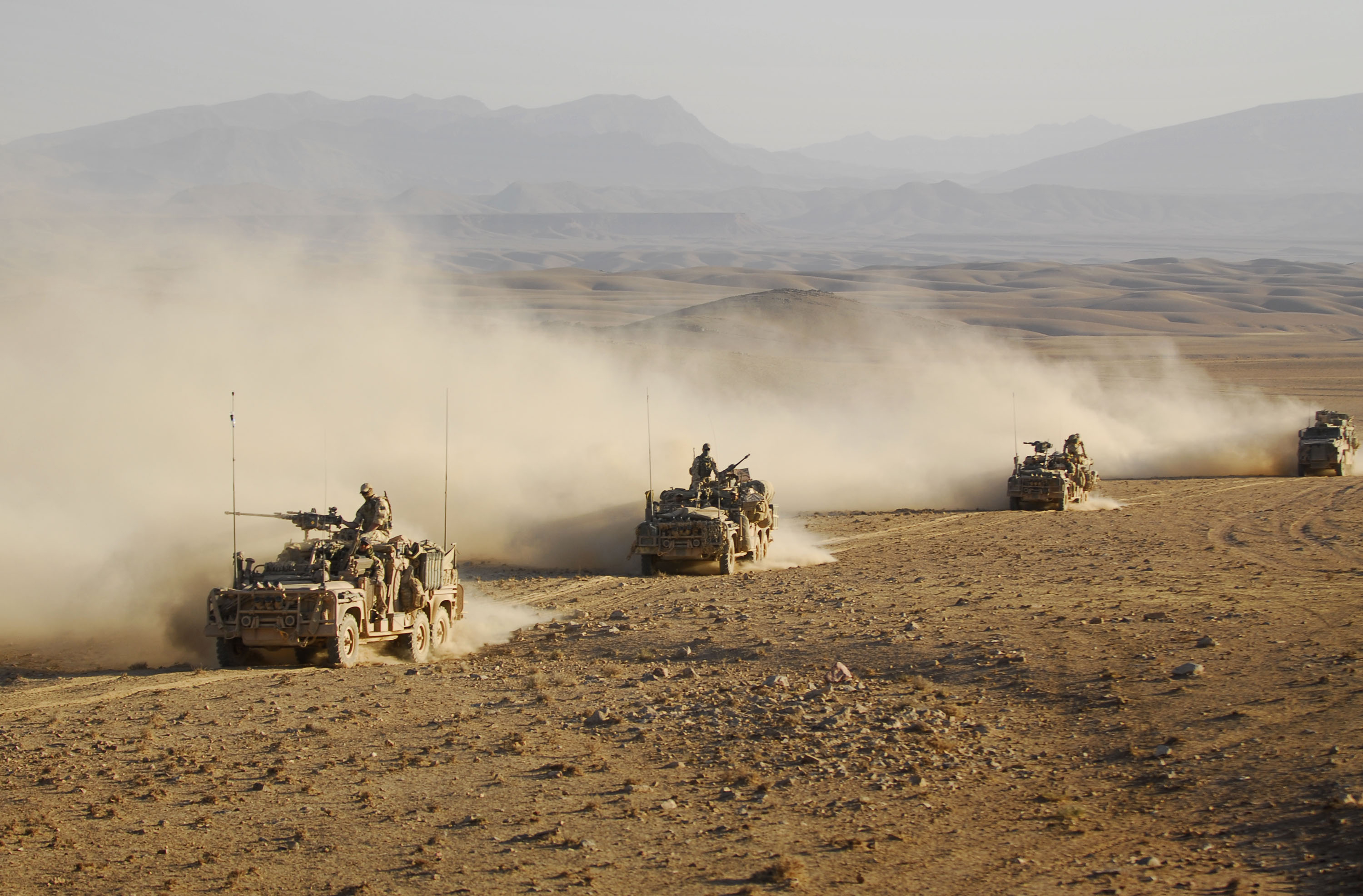
Australian special forces in Afghanistan during 2009 operating heavily modified Land Rover Long Range Patrol Vehicles

The Land Rover Perentie is a nickname for the Land Rover 110 produced by JRA Limited for the Australian Army, and part manufactured and assembled in Moorebank, New South Wales, during the 1980s and 1990s. There were two build contracts; the first was in 1988 and the second a decade later. The Perentie was based on the Land Rover Defender 110, and was introduced in 1987 to replace the ageing fleet of Series 2A and 3 Land Rovers.

The Land Rover Perenties were produced in 4x4 and 6x6 variants and powered by an Isuzu 3.9-litre four-cylinder 4BD1 diesel engine or 4BD1-T turbo (see List of Isuzu engines). They have proven themselves both in Australia and on operations overseas, including in Somalia, Timor Leste, the Solomon Islands, Iraq and Afghanistan.

== Design ==
The major differences between the Land Rover Perentie and British Land Rovers are the relocation of the spare wheel to a position under the rear of the load area, a galvanised chassis and the Isuzu engine. The original army contract called for a variety of unusual features including being able to sustain being hung from a helicopter by one corner without causing the chassis to distort. The 6x6 version has a wider cab and load-sharing leaf-sprung rear axles. The 6x6 also has a turbocharger. The original order was for 2,500 4x4 and 400 6x6 vehicles between 1987 and 1990, while further vehicles were later added under Project Bushranger. All vehicles were equipped with black-out and convoy lighting circuitry. The 6X6 Perentie has a wheelbase from front axle to second axle of 3040mm (119.7"), to rear axle of 3940mm (155").

== History ==
The name Perentie originates from Land Rover's successful tender to Project Perentie, which was the official Australian Army trial to select new 1 and 2-tonne light vehicles. During the Project Perentie trials the Land Rover/Isuzu 110 and 6x6 variants were compared against the Jeep AM10, the Mercedes-Benz 300GD and the Unimog, while the Toyota Land Cruiser was evaluated two years later. The origins of the name comes from the Perentie (Varanus giganteus) lizard species, which is the largest goanna lizard native to Australia.

As of February 2013 the Perenties are being disposed of, with the remaining in-service units being replaced by Mercedes-Benz G-Wagens under Project Land 121.

The Defender has proven to be vulnerable to land mines and improvised explosive devices, and the army's new specification calls for optional armour. The Army Perenties are being replaced with unarmoured Mercedes G-Wagens.

"Land Rover vehicles built for the ADF under the Perentie (1984–92) and Bushranger contracts (1992–98) were specially designed 4x4 and 6x6 vehicles built at either Moorebank (Perentie) or Adelaide (Bushranger) and had different power units and transmission systems to the Solihull-built, Defender-based Land Rover 110 vehicles now commissioned. George Fowler, LRA engineering, who is responsible for the development of this latest production-based Land Rover 110, said the order for the new TD5 Defender was a breakthrough for LRA in the ADF vehicle procurement program."

"The ADF has decided to use a production vehicle which is designed for a ten-year period of service. This decision recognises the increased levels of reliability and durability of a Solihull-production Defender 110, with the new Td5 power unit."

"George Fowler and his team of engineers developed a concept vehicle, based on a production Land Rover 110, that was similar to existing Perentie and Bushranger Land Rover 4x4 vehicles in terms of driver control layout and ancillary equipment."

== Variants ==
=== 4x4 Variants ===
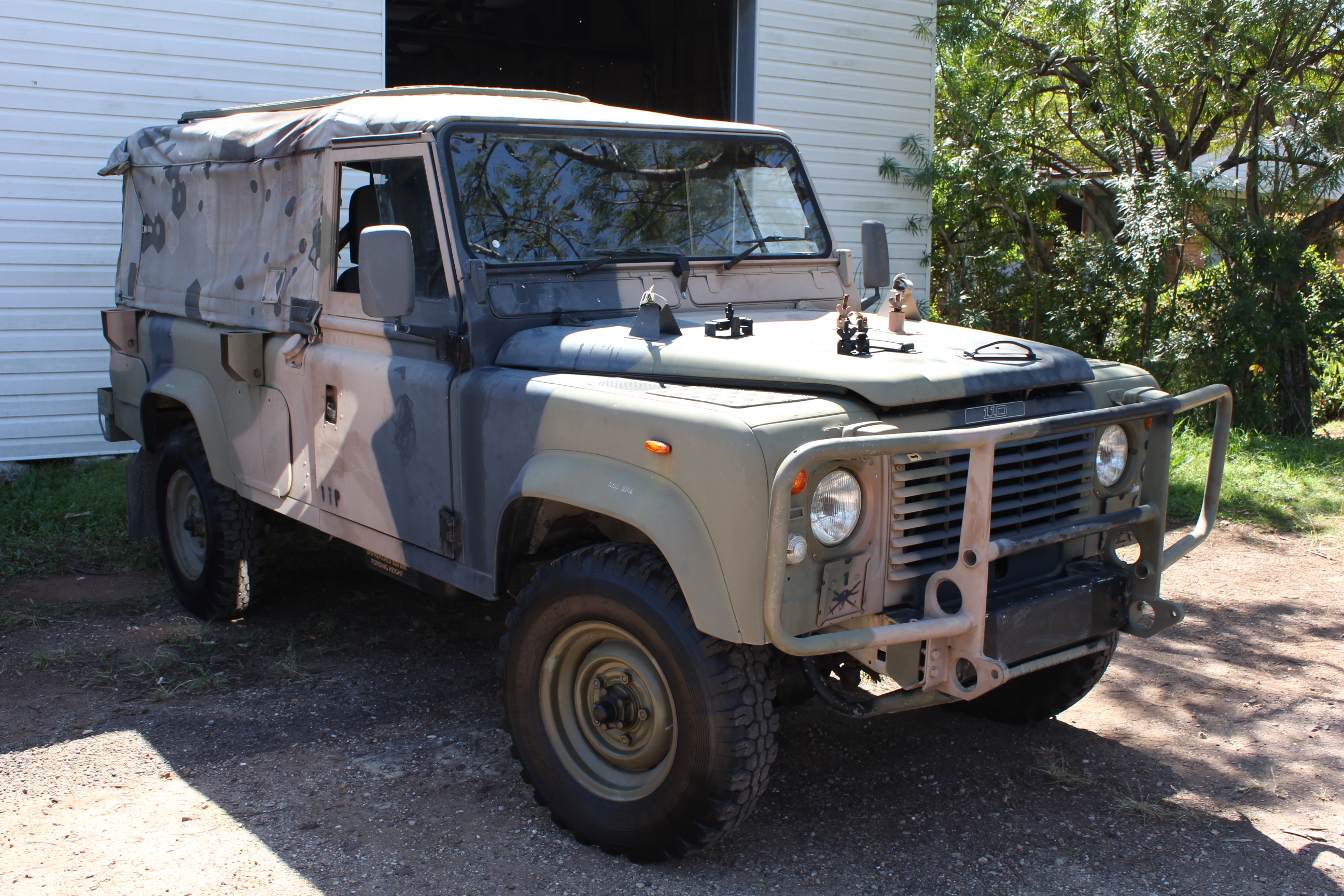
A retired 1989 Land Rover Perentie 4x4

- Truck, Utility, Lightweight, MC2 (Mobility Category 2) (1222 Vehicles)
- Truck, Utility, Lightweight, Winch, MC2 (314 Vehicles)
- Truck, Utility, Lightweight, FFR (Fitted For Radio), MC2 (964 Vehicles)
- Truck, Utility, Lightweight, FFR, Winch, MC2 (208 Vehicles)
- Truck, Panel, Lightweight, Survey, FFR, Winch, MC2 (35 Vehicles)
- Truck, Carryall, Lightweight, Senior Commander, FFR, Winch, MC2 (11 Vehicles)
- Truck, Carryall, Lightweight, Personnel Carrier, MC2 (38 Vehicles)
- Truck, Surveillance, Lightweight, Winch, MC2 (RFSV, Regional Forces Surveillance Vehicle) (231 Vehicles)

=== 6x6 Variants ===
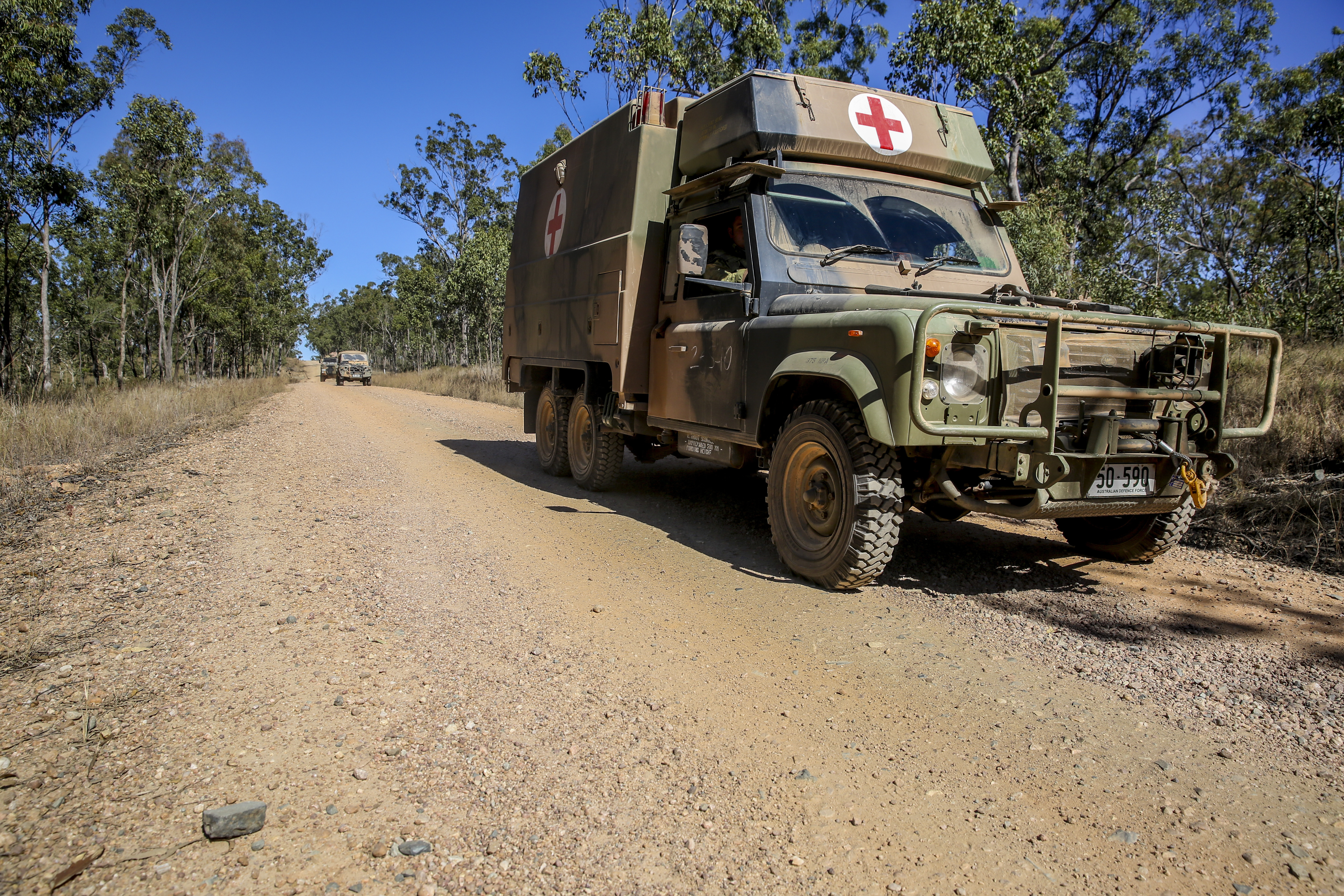
Ambulance in Exercise Hamel in 2014

- Truck, Cargo, Light, MC2 (215 Vehicles)
- Truck, Cargo, Light, Winch, MC2 (32 Vehicles)
- Truck, Ambulance, 4 Litter, FFR, Winch, MC2 (94 Vehicles)
- Truck, General Maintenance, Light, Winch, MC2 (GMV) (181 Vehicles)
- Truck, Electronic Repair, Light, MC2 (ERV) (40 Vehicles) and Truck, Comsec Repair Workshop *Vehicle, Light, MC2 (12 Vehicles)
- Truck, Long Range Patrol, Light, Winch, MC2 (LRPV) (27 Vehicles)
- Truck, Air Defence, Light, FFR, Winch, MC2 (72 Vehicles)
- Truck, Crew Cab, Light, Winch, MC2 (26 Vehicles)
- Truck, Infantry Improvised Mobility Vehicle, MC2 (number unknown)

== See also ==
- Land Rover Wolf
- Land Rover 1/2 ton Lightweight
- Land Rover Defender
