= Mack Trucks in military service =

AC Series
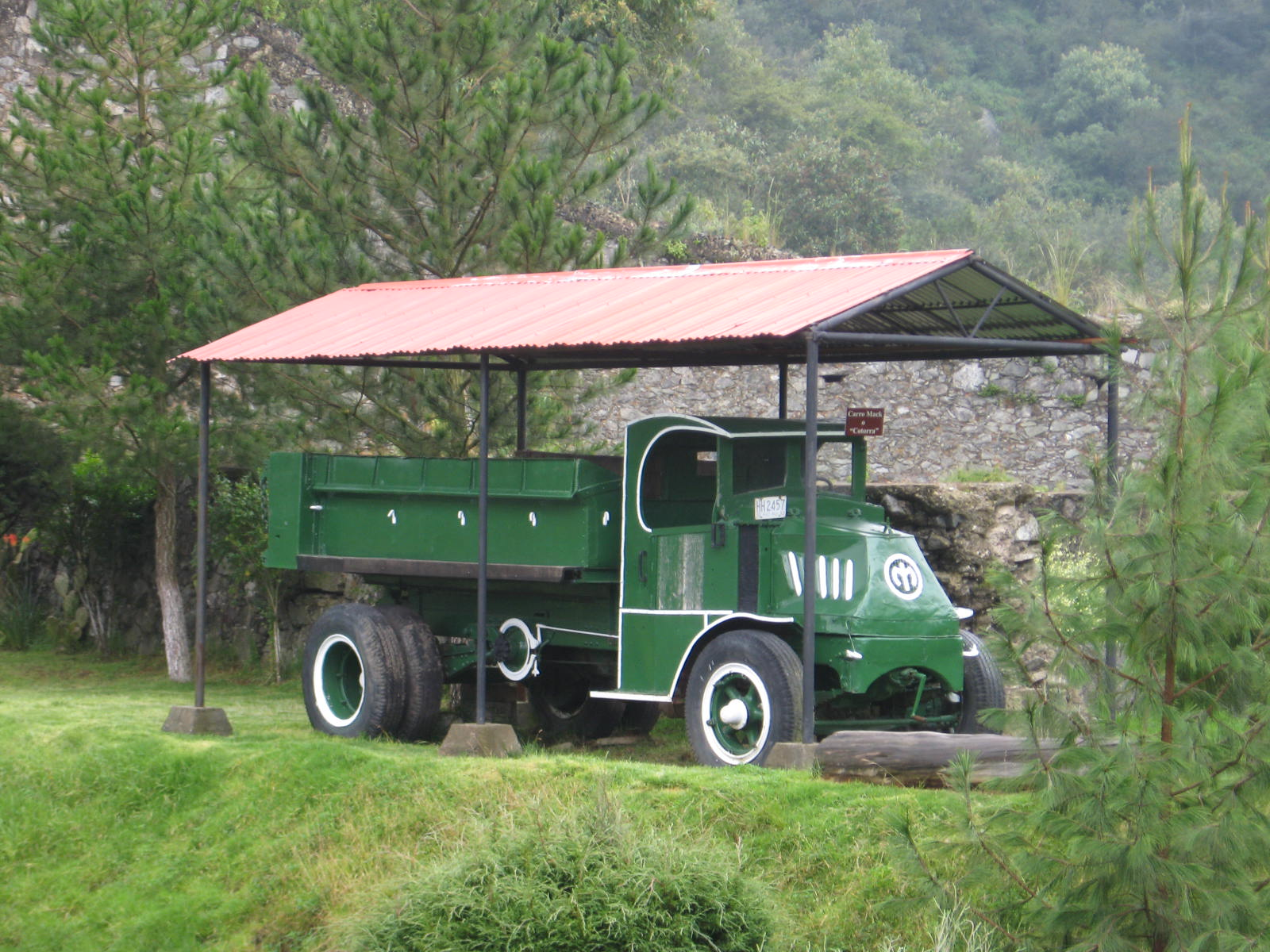

Production history
- Type: Heavy duty 4x2
- Built: 1916–1939
- Total built: 1916–1918: 2,700+
- Variants: Cargo, dump, van, tank, off-road

EH series
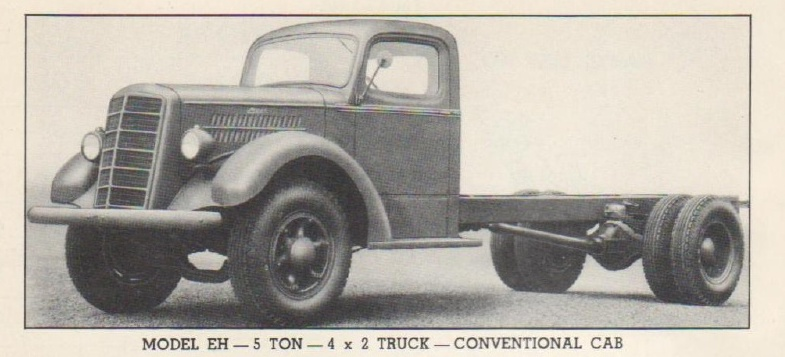

Production history
- Type: Commercial 4x2
- Built: 1943-1944
- Total built: 3,450
- Variants: COE, semi-tractor, open cab

LMSW Series
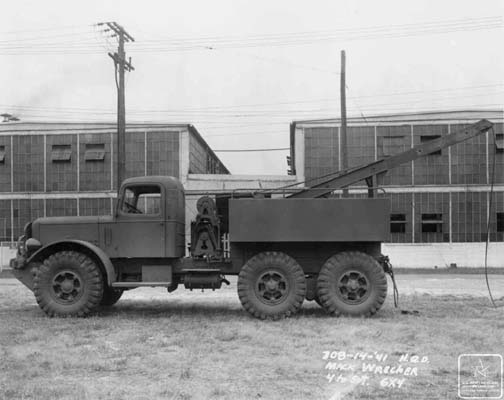
- Wrecker

Production history
- Type: 5-ton 6x4
- Built: 1942-1944
- Variants: Closed and open cab

Model NJU (G-639)
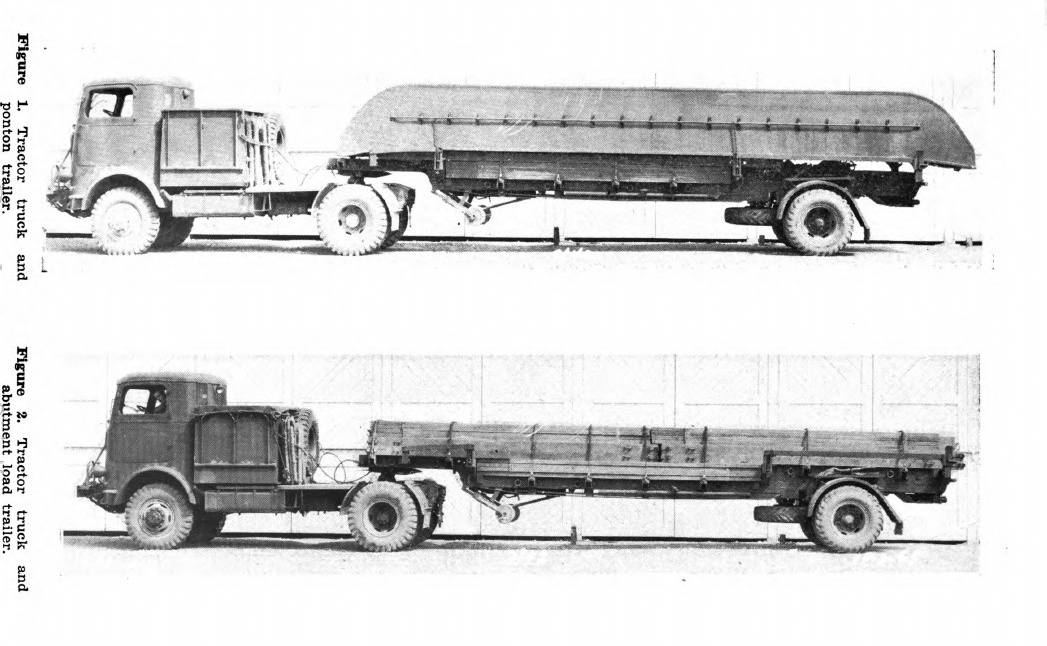

Production history
- Type: 5-ton 4x4 ponton semi-tractor
- Built: 1941-1942
- Total built: 692
- Variants: Closed van (8)

NM series (G-535)
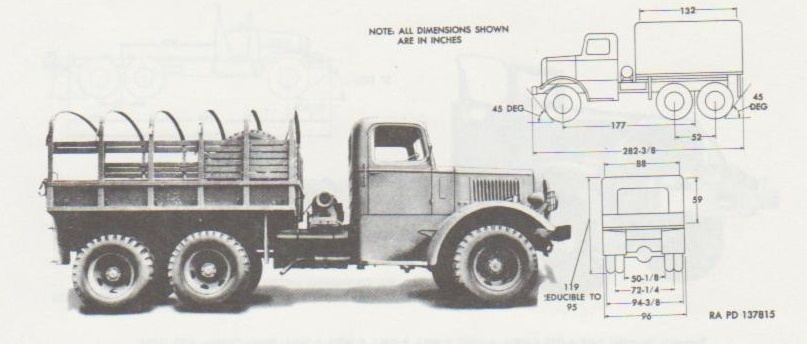
- NM2 Prime mover

Production history
- Type: 6-ton 6x6 Prime-mover
- Built: 1940-1944
- Total built: 8,400

NO series (G-532)
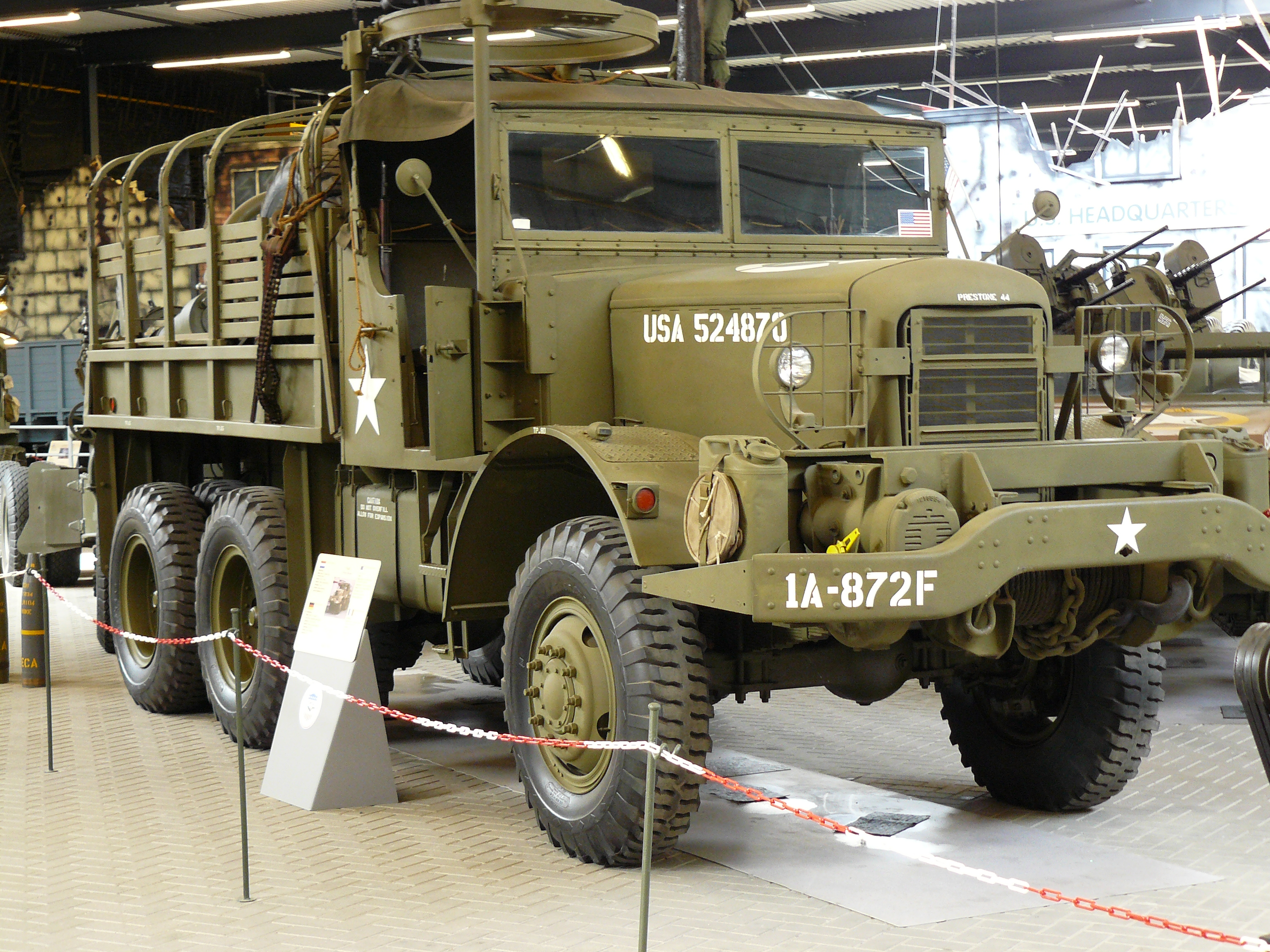
- Prime mover

Production history
- Type: 7 1/2-ton 6x6
- Built: 1943-1945
- Total built: 2,050

NR series
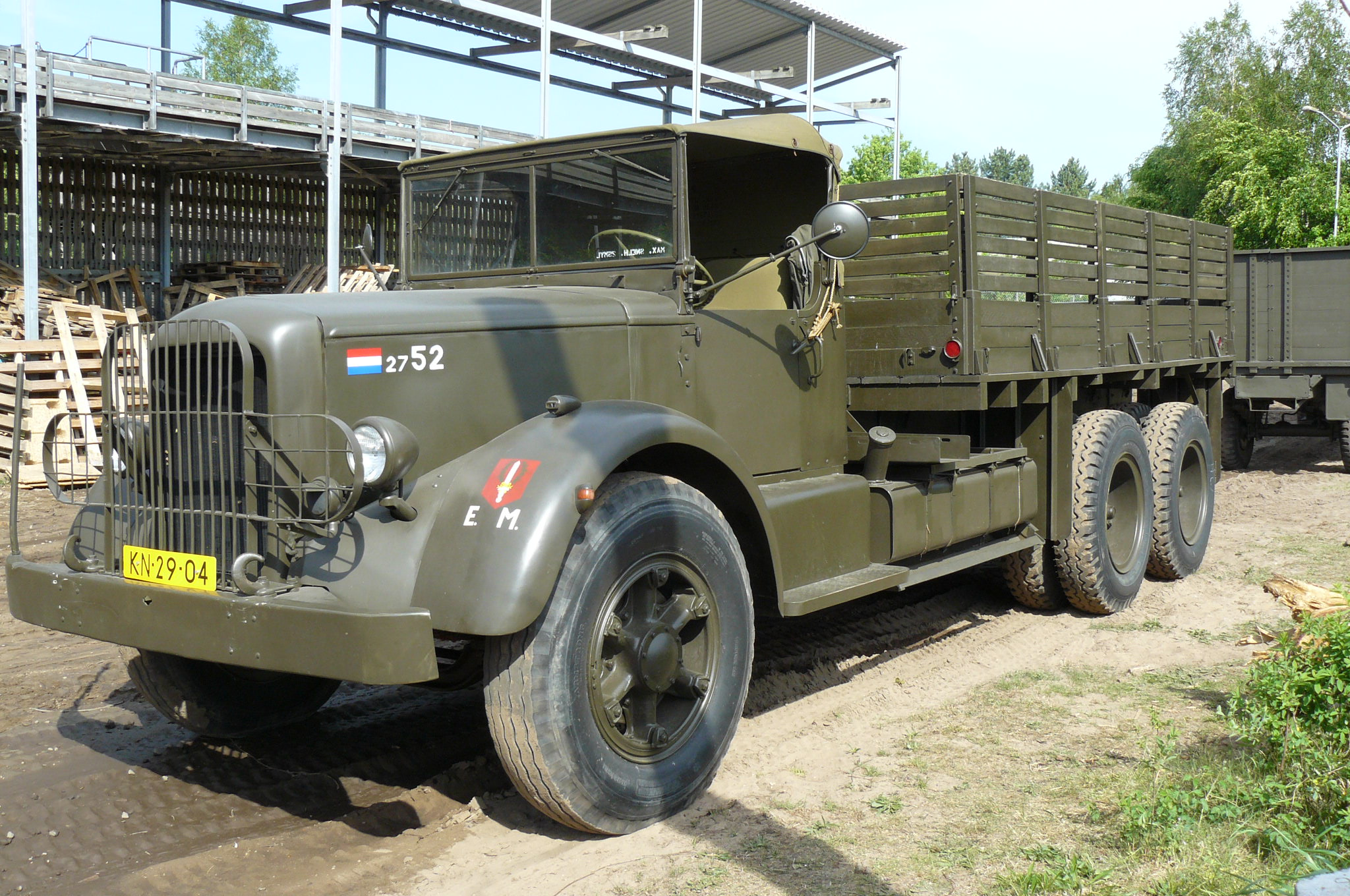

Production history
- Type: 10-ton 6x4 Cargo truck
- Built: 1940-1944
- Total built: 15,528
- Variants: Closed and open cab

M54 series (G744)
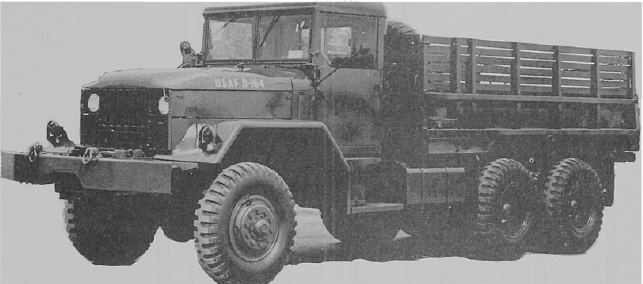
- M54 Cargo

Production history
- Type: 5-ton 6x6 cargo truck
- Built: 1952-1965
- Variants: Dump, wrecker, tractor, and others

M123 and M125 (G792)
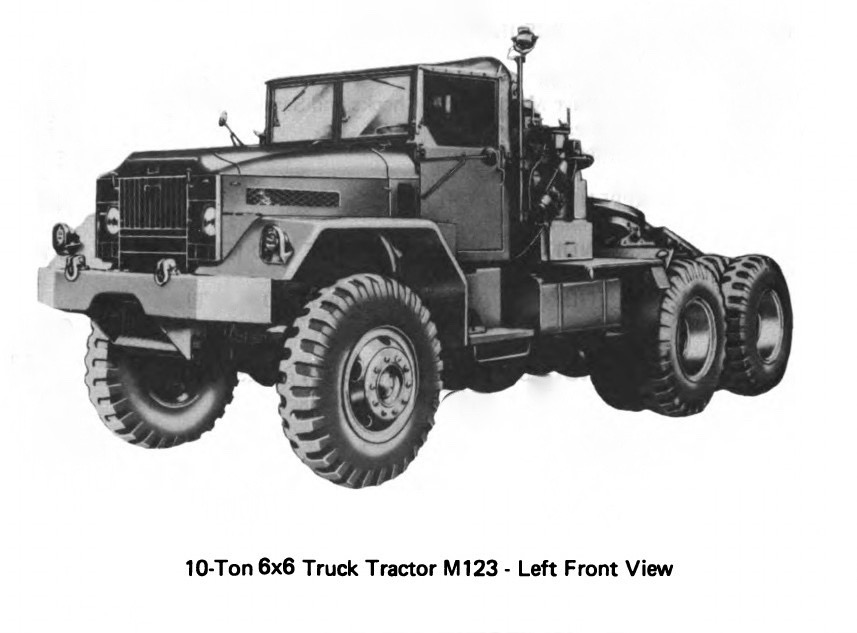
- M123 Semi-tractor

Production history
- Type: 10-ton 6x6 truck
- Built: 1955-1969
- Total built: 4,032
- Variants: Semi-tractor, prime-mover

R611
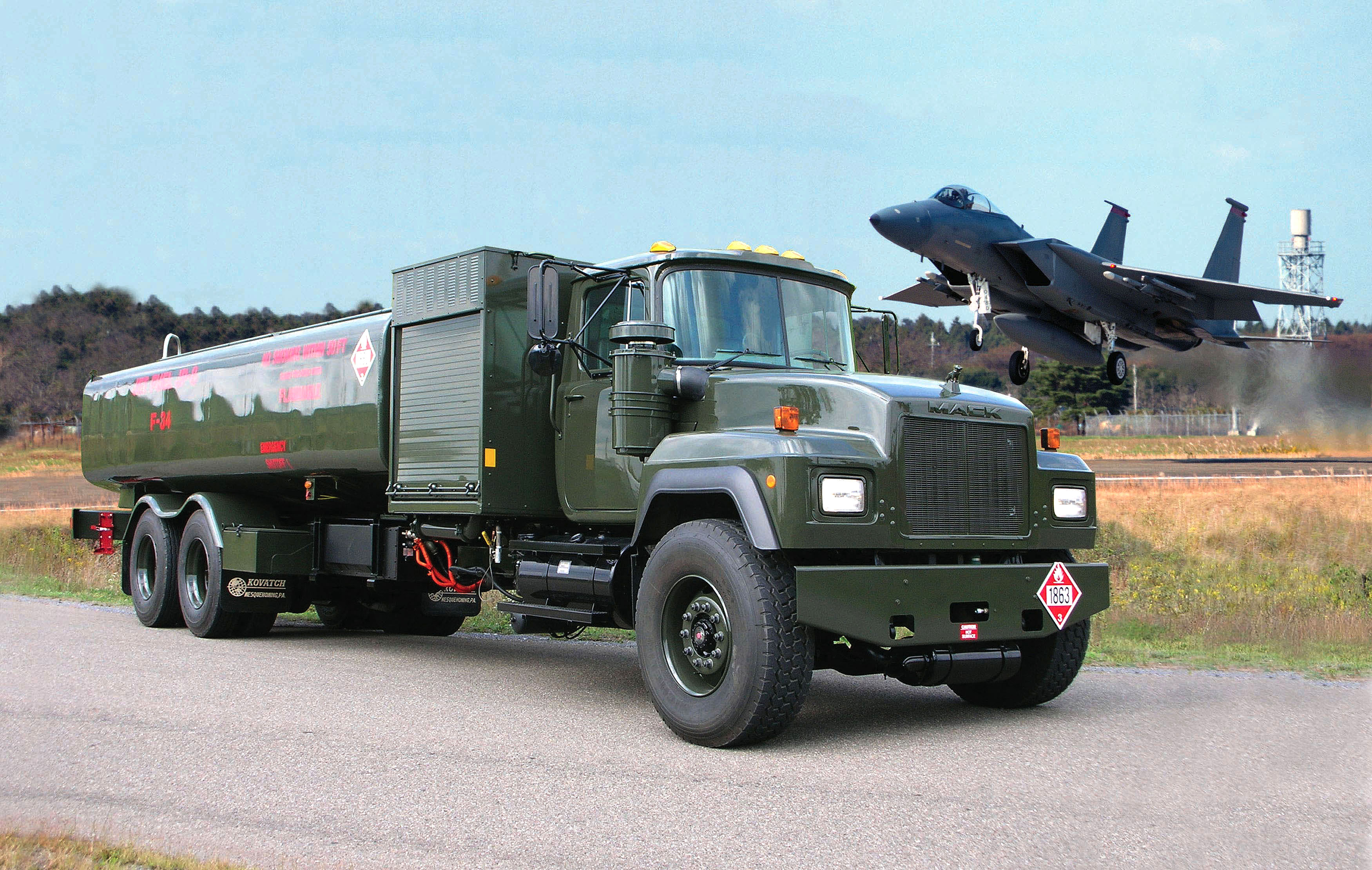
- R Fuel tanker (Electric hybrid)

Production history
- Type: Commercial 6x4
- Built: 1965-2005
- Variants: Semi-tractor, tanker

RM6866RS
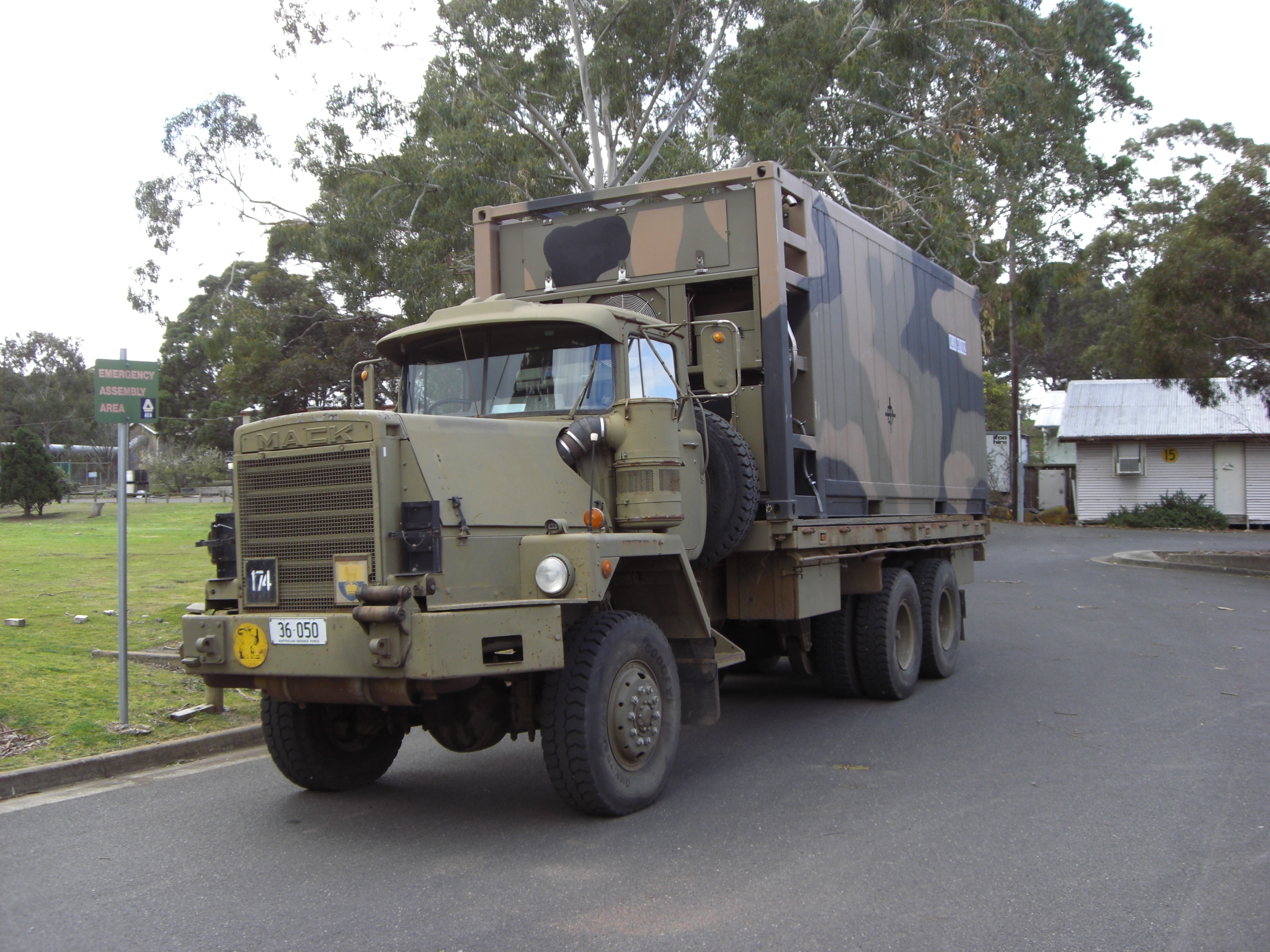
- MC3 with container

Production history
- Type: 8-ton 6x6 truck
- Built: 1982-
- Total built: 900+
- Variants: Dump, flatbed, and others

Mack Trucks has been selling heavy duty trucks and buses to the United States military since 1911. Virtually every model has been used. The majority have been commercial models designed and built by Mack with their own components, but they have also designed and built military specification tactical trucks. The military vehicles are rated by payload measured in tons (1 ton is 907 kg).

== World War I ==
Before the US entered the war the Army had used small numbers of Mack trucks in trials. The commercial AC, designed with US Army input, was introduced in 1916. First purchased by the United Kingdom, it was an immediate success in military service.

=== AC series ===
The model AC, with its well-known "Renault style" tapered hood, was introduced in 1916. A 4X2 with chain drive, it was strong, reliable, and worked well in rough terrain. It had a 471 cu in (7.7 L) L-head inline 4 cylinder gasoline engine developing 40 hp (30 kW). Over 2,500 3 1/2, 5 1/2, and 7 1/2-ton trucks were built for the UK and US military. The US Army made it the only standard truck over 5 tons.

=== AP series ===
The model AP, introduced in 1926, was an 8-ton 6x4 similar to but larger than the AC. It had a 706 cu in (11.6 L) L-head inline 6 cylinder developing 150 hp (110 kW) at 2000 rpm. In 1929 the US Army bought them as prime movers and tank carriers.

== World War II ==
In 1940 the British began buying Macks; when the US entered the war all production was for US and Allied militaries. In addition to commercial models Mack also designed and built a large number of tactical trucks. Because of their proprietary, rather than common standard, design, many were exported to US allies. Tank transmissions and marine diesels were also manufactured. By the end of the war Mack had supplied over 32,000 trucks and other components worth over $3,000,000.

=== E series ===
The E series was introduced in 1936 as a conventional or cabover 4x2 truck; larger models were also available as semi-tractors. It was a modern design, with a closed cab, roll up windows, and auto type styling. Early models had an EN310 310 cu in (5.1 L) L-head inline 6 cylinder gasoline engine developing 90 hp (67 kW). Later models could have the larger EN354 354 cu in (5.8 L) engine developing 110 hp (82 kW) at 2,620 rpm and 254 lbf⋅ft (344 N⋅m) at 1,200 rpm.

By 1940 the US Army and Marines were using 2 1/2-ton EE dump trucks, EH 5-ton fuel tankers, EHU cabover wreckers, and other specialty vehicles. Early models were standard commercial models, with chrome trim and hubcaps, in 1942 all trucks became plainer.

The military model EH was a 5-ton on road 4x2 cargo truck. The EH, EHU (cabover) and semi-tractor models EHT and EHUT had EN354 engines and disc wheels. Early trucks had standard commercial cabs, later open military cabs were used. Of 3,500 EH and 50 EHT built in 1943–1944, over 2,400 were exported to the British.

=== LMSW ===
The Mack LMSW 10-ton 6x4 truck, introduced in 1940, was a commercial design heavy duty truck larger than the E series.

The LMSW 10 ton 6x4 chassis was adapted for military wreckers in North Africa. Their EP 611 cu in (10.0 L) gasoline OHV I6 developed 160 hp (119 kW).

They had wide tandem rear axles so oversize 14.00x20 single rear tires could be used. Models 23 (193) and 39 (181) went to the British, models 53 (130) and 57 (160) went to the Canadians. The primary difference between the models was their bodies, Model 57s also had an open cab. They were shipped partially knocked down, with the cab, chassis, and body shipped separately and assembled at their destination. All Model 39s were shipped to India for use in the Far East.

The LPSW was a 17 1/2-ton 6x4 dump truck. Intended for the Panama Canal, some were sent to the British for use in the Pacific theater. They had a 12 cubic yards (9.2 m^{3}) rear dump body and an open cab with a windshield on the left half only.

=== NJU ===
The NJU (G-639) was a military design 5-ton off-road 4x4 semi-tractor used to tow bridging pontoons and equipment. Their 532 cu in (8.7 L) L-head inline 6 cylinder gasoline engine developed 136 hp (101 kW) at 2400 rpm. Unlike most semi-tractors, all but 8 NJUs had a large toolbox behind the cab to carry outboard engines and other tools used in bridge building. 8 NJU-2s were used for communications trailers and had no toolboxes. Several other manufactures built standardized models of similar trucks, so only 700 NJUs were produced in 1941–1942.

=== NM ===
The NM was Mack's first tactical military vehicle. A 6-ton off-road artillery prime mover used to tow AA guns and crews. Their EY 707 cu in (11.6 L) overhead valve inline 6 cylinder gasoline engine developed 170 hp (130 kW).

Models 1, 2, and 3 had the enclosed cab from the commercial L-model and commercial tires. Models 5, 6, 7, and 8 (there was no NM-4) had open cabs and military non-directional tires. Other than cabs and tires, NMs had only minor detail differences. Over 8,400 of all models were built in 1940–1944.

=== NO ===
The NO series were 7 1/2-ton 6x6 artillery prime movers meant to tow the 155mm "Long Tom" field gun, 8 inch howitzer, and 240mm howitzer (the 240mm howitzer was two separate loads). They used the same EY 707 cu in (11.6 L) overhead valve inline 6 cylinder gasoline engine developing 170 hp (130 kW) as the NM series. The NO-2, −3, −6, and −7 varied only in details (NO-1, −4, and −5 were single prototypes). 2050 production NOs were built in 1943–1945, all 1097 NO-3 and −6 models were exported.

=== NR ===
The NR (G528) was 10-ton 6x4 cargo trucks similar to the L series. An ED 519 cu in (8.5 L) inline 6 cylinder diesel engine developed 131 hp (98 kW).

Originally intended for British use as light tank transporters in North Africa, they had wide rear tandems so that oversize 14.00x20 single tires could be used. 90 NR1 had cabs of the obsolete EX, models NR2 to NR7 had L series cabs, NR8 and later had open cabs. Other differences between models were body types, some components, and minor details. All were exported as partly knocked down, with the chassis, cab, and body shipped separately then assembled at their destination. Unlike most US trucks they had diesel engines, making them valuable for long-distance trips. Over 15,000 were built between 1940 and 1944, the most of any series.

After the war, several Mack military trucks were purchased as surplus by European owners. In Belgium, the ministry of provision bought 380 Mack NR in order to compensate a truck shortage and the destruction of railways during the war. When the railroads improved, at least 50 Mack NR4D were rebuilt as cab-over buses for the National Vicinal tramway company (SNCV/NMVB) or private contractors. In other countries, surplus Mack NR trucks were also fitted with various bus, truck or van bodies.

== 1945 to 1965 ==
In the 1950s Mack built US standard tactical trucks, as well as supplying commercial models for non combat roles.

=== M54 series ===
The M54 (officially M39) series (G-744) was a standardized military design 5-ton off-road 6x6 chassis, with many models. Continental 6606 602 cu in (9.9 L) overhead valve inline 6 cylinder gasoline engine developing 224 hp (167 kW) at 2800 rpm was used. In 1952 Mack began building the M51 Dump (4,310), M52 Semi-tractor (1,443), M54 Cargo (1,126), M55 Long cargo (85), and M61 Chassis-cab (107). In 1962 they took part in program to retrofit some of the series with a Mack ENDT 673 673 cu in (11.0 L) turbocharged inline 6 cylinder diesel engine developing 210 hp (160 kW) at 2100 rpm. Inside two years, after 2,500 conversions, the Army standardized the Continental LDS-465-1A, a 478 cu in (7.8 L) turbocharged inline 6 cylinder multifuel engine developing 175 hp (130 kW) at 2100 rpm.

=== M123 and M125 ===
The M123 & M125 were standardized military design 10-ton off-road 6x6 semi tractors and artillery prime movers. Designed by Mack, they used many components from the NO series. A LeRoi T-H844 844 cu in (13.8 L) overhead valve V8 cylinder gasoline engine developed 297 hp (221 kW) at 2600 rpm. Mack built 392 M123s, used with a lowboy trailer to recover and transport tanks, and all 552 M125s, between 1955 and 1957.

Later follow-up orders called for 420 M123A1s with a Cummins V8-300 785 cu in (12.9 L) naturally aspirated V8 diesel engine developing 300 hp (220 kW) at 3000 rpm and 580 lbf⋅ft (786 N⋅m) torque at 2100 rpm. Mack also retrofitted 210 gasoline engine M123s with the same engine

== 1965 to 2005 ==
In 1966 the R and similar DM series conventional commercial design were introduced. The US military used many off the shelf models. Both R and DM were available with full-time all wheel drive. Trucks sold overseas were often sold with military options, one of the most popular was the sheet metal hood and fenders (also available on commercial models).

=== DM400 ===
The DM492S was a 5,000 US gal (19,000 L) 6x4 aircraft refueler. A mid-range Caterpillar 3208 636 cu in (10.4 L) V8 diesel engine developed 225 hp (168 kW) at 2,800rpm. The US Air Force ordered 1,010 in 1980.

=== R600 ===
The R611ST was a typical 6x4 commercial design semi-tractor. An ENDT673 673 cu in (11.0 L) turbocharged inline 6-cylinder diesel developed 225 hp (168 kW) at 2,100rpm.

=== RM6866RS series ===
The RM6866RS was a 12-ton 6x6 tactical truck. An EM6 Maxidyne 673 cu in (11.0 L) turbocharged inline 6 cylinder diesel developed 285 hp (213 kW) at 1,800rpm. The Australian Army ordered 940 with delivery starting in 1982.

They had right-hand drive and were assembled in Australia. Cargo, dump, prime mover, wrecker, fuel tanker, water tanker, bridging, and concrete mixer models were built. The asphalt distributor was a 6x4.

The cargo models previously carried one APC of the M113 and M113A1 Variants, however upon the Australian Army upgrading to the M113AS4 variant the APC was too large to be placed on the rear of an RM6866RS

Twenty Foot Equivalent Container Units can also be placed onto the vehicle for transport., and some have a self-loading crane between the cab and body.

The RM6866RS series of trucks is currently being superseded by the Rheinmetall-Man HX Series of vehicles in service under the Land-121 Project. However a delay in delivery for a number of variants of the new vehicles means that a large number for RM6866RS Vehicles are still in service in 2019.

== 2005 to 2015 ==
With the end of R/DM production in 2004–2006, the successor Granite series has been offered with military options. Mack is also involved in the Sherpa line of medium armored cars and supplies components for military service.

=== Granite series ===
The Mack Granite GU813E is a 6x4 personnel carrier. A MP8 13-Liter turbocharged inline 6 diesel develops 400 hp (300 kW) and 1,460 lbf⋅ft (1,979 N⋅m). A semi-tractor, wrecker, fuel tanker and water tanker are offered. The similar Vision is offered as a semi-tractor with sleeper cab.

=== Sherpa ===
The Sherpa Carrier is a 2 to 4-ton (1,814 to 3,629 kg) 4x4 armored cargo truck. A turbocharged inline 4 diesel engine develops 215 hp (160 kW) at 2300 rpm and 590 lbf⋅ft (800 N⋅m) of torque at 1200 - 1700 rpm. It is also offered as a 4-door personnel carrier, an open roof model, and a lightweight 105mm howitzer carrier.
