= Shanzhai =

Goods designed to imitate high-end products

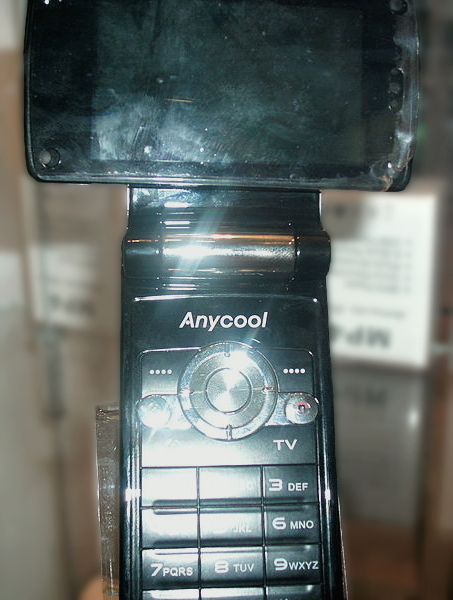
An Anycool V876 mobile phone featuring a rotatable screen. The name "Anycool" was meant to copy Anycall, Samsung's brand for phones in South Korea and Greater China. The addition of extra features not found in authentic products is indicative of shanzhai electronics, particularly in the 2000s.

Shanzhai (Chinese: 山寨; pinyin: shānzhài; Cantonese Jyutping: saan1 zaai6; Vietnamese: sơn trại) is a Chinese term literally meaning "mountain fortress" or "mountain camp", whose contemporary use usually encompasses counterfeit, imitation, or parody products and events and the subculture surrounding them. Shanzhai products can include counterfeit consumer and electronic goods, which can involve the imitation and trademark infringement of brands and companies. The term's modern usage grew around 2008 when shanzhai smartphones reached their greatest domestic use. Today, some relate the term with grassroots innovation and creativity rather than with falsehood or imitation.

== Origin ==
The term shanzhai literal means mountain forts or strongholds, usually controlled by criminal organizations such as bandits, brigands and pirates, as well as tribal militia and even some warlords. During the Song dynasty (960–1279), shanzhai came to popular usage to describe the barricaded mountain hideouts or safehouses commonly used by outlaw groups who resisted law enforcement and conducted what they saw as justified vigilantism against corrupted authorities. The most well-known use of shanzhai in this sense is in Water Margin, one of the Four Great Classical Novels, in which the rebel anti-heroes pride themselves in vulgar, violent martial romance.

"Shanzhai goods" originally means unbranded products made in small, poorly equipped sweat factories with limited to no quality control, with the analogy drawn to the improvized weapons, gears and provisions stored in a mountain fort by outlaws, which is conceptually similar to the terms "pirate goods" and "bootlegging" in the English language. In contemporary usage during the late 2000s and early 2010s, shanzhai goods are often regarded as an indigenous, grassroot defiance against the cosmopolitan consumer market, which was then dominated by brand loyalty towards established foreign imports, invoking the spirit of rebelliousness and unapologetically low-cost practicality that the term was originally associated with during the Song dynasty. Some shanzhai products are created with the intent to deceive buyers, although others are created with unorthodox features not included in their respective authentic counterparts, or are created out of jest or parody (such as the CCSTV New Year's Gala). Unlike counterfeiters, producers of shanzhai goods typically do not conceal the lack of prestige for their products and buyers are generally aware of the cost-effectiveness of the purchase.

== Products ==
Typical shanzhai products include imitators of high-end electronics and fashion products that imitate the visual appearance and function of leading brands.

During the early-2000s, early instances of shanzhai production began, mostly with simple counterfeiting of electronic goods including DVD and MP3 players in cities such as those in the Pearl River Delta.

In the mid-2000s, more advanced products such as smartphones were being created, with varying levels of skill and quality, leading to the term shanzhai being applied to counterfeit goods. Shanzhai mobile phone production contributed to widespread access to inexpensive mobile phones in China. By the end of 2006, it is estimated that shanzhai mobile phone manufacturers accounted for around 30 percent of the domestic phone market in China.

In 2009, it was reported that shanzhai mobile phones could be sold for about $100 to $150 USD, while production costs were only about US$20.

In 2010, the Financial Times estimated that shanzhai phones accounted for about 20 percent of the global 2G mobile phone market. Demand for these 2G-era shanzhai mobile phones was not only in China, but particularly in developing countries in Asia, Africa, and Latin America as well.

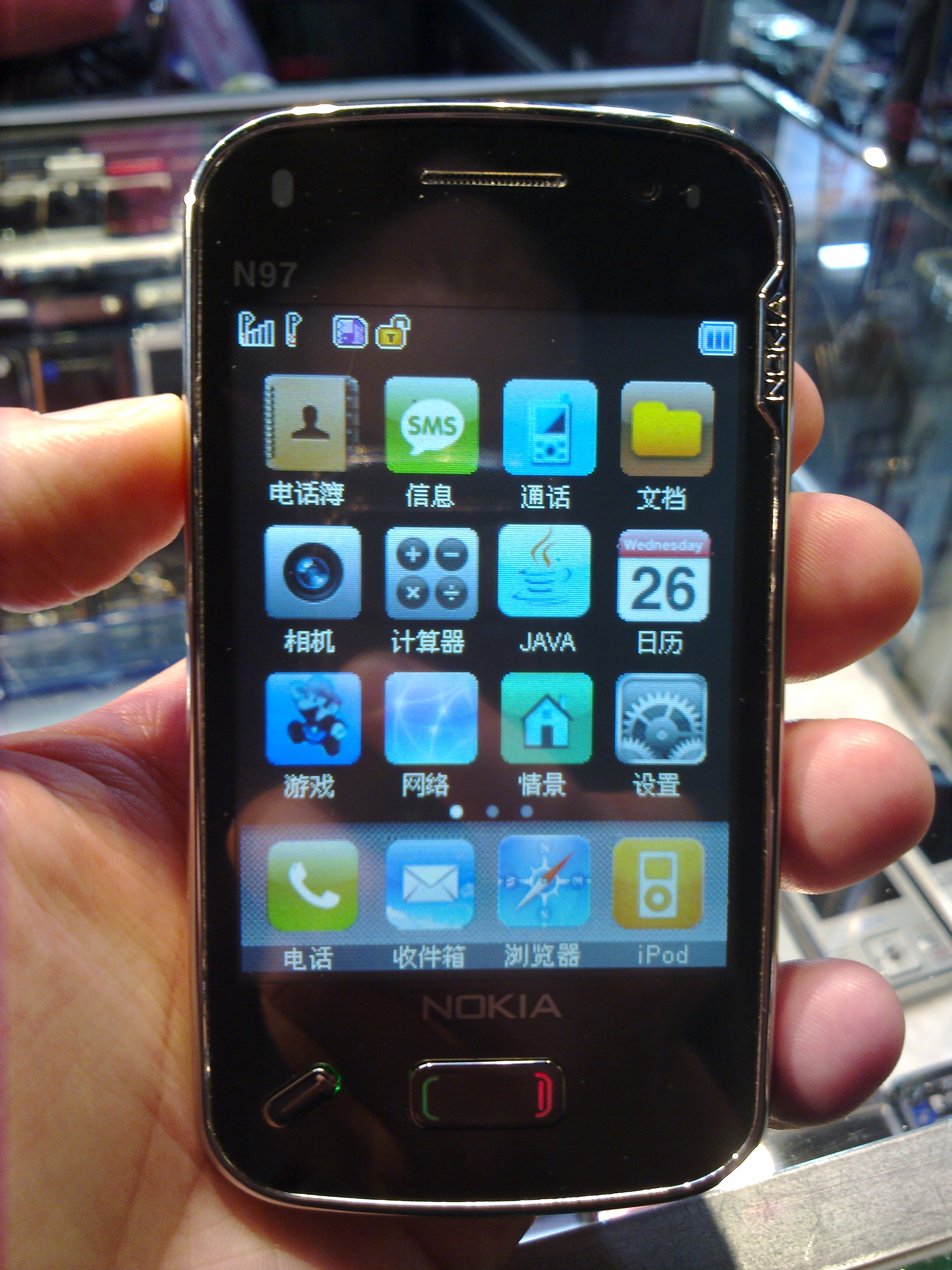
An example of an imitation phone, with the phone being an imitation Nokia N97 with an iPhone OS 3-like user interface.

The prevalence of shanzhai phones is usually attributed to their low price, multi-functional performance, and imitations of trendy mobile phone design. Although shanzhai companies do not use branding as a marketing strategy, they are known for their flexibility of design to meet specific market needs.

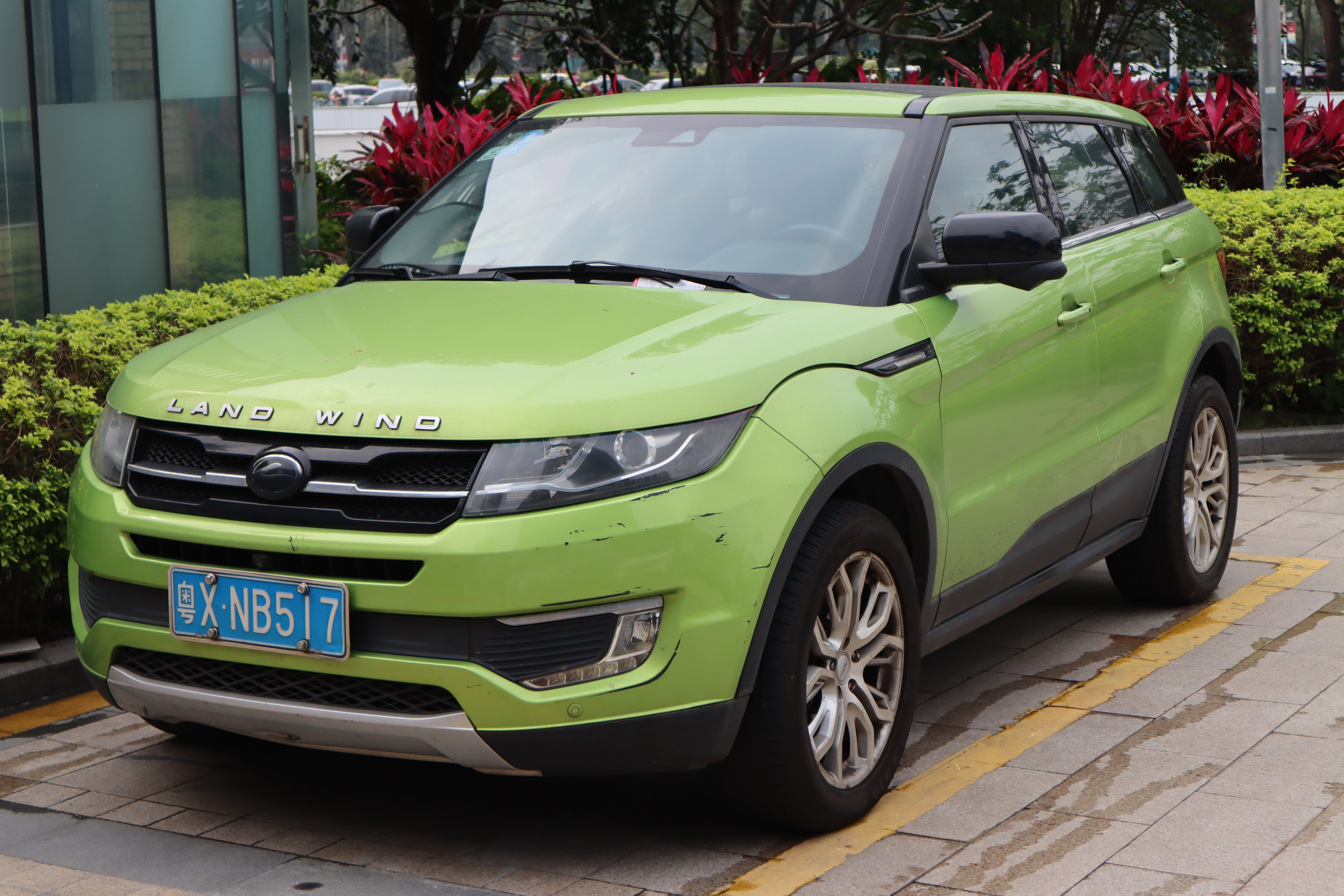
A Landwind X7 SUV which resembles a Range Rover Evoque

However, shanzhai is not limited to mobile phones. As Yu Hua explains:

Once copycat cell phones had taken China by storm, copycat digital cameras, copycat MP3 players, copycat game consoles and other pirated and knockoff products came pouring forth. Copycat brands have rapidly expanded to include instant noodles, sodas, milk, medications, laundry detergent and sports shoes, and so the word "copycat" has penetrated deep into every aspect of Chinese people's lives. Copycat stars, TV programs, advertisements, pop songs, Spring Festival galas, Shenzhou 7 space capsules and Bird's Nest national stadiums have all made a splash on the Internet, each revealing their own special flavor and gaining instant popularity.

Reflecting the interests of customers, some shanzhai companies reflect politics and culture through their products, often alongside parody. One of the most well-publicized examples of this was during Barack Obama's 2008 U.S. presidential election campaign, when some shanzhai mobile phone companies began to include Obama-based themes in their goods and advertisements. Also in 2008, some shanzhai products were based on the Beijing National Stadium and Fuwa in light of the Beijing Olympic Games that year.

=== Decline ===
Since the 2010s, there has been a decrease in the prevalence of shanzhai products within China. Although some groups and individuals do still make replica or fake versions of popular products, the growth of well-established domestic companies producing low-cost and/or high-quality electronic goods has eclipsed much of the market for counterfeit goods. Groups that do counterfeit domestic companies are also often subject to legal repercussions for their actions, while the counterfeiting of foreign goods is much more difficult to prosecute.

Another reason involved in the decline in shanzhai electronics may be related to the transition of MediaTek to producing chips for more established companies such as Xiaomi and Oppo, rather than just for the general consumer market. During the 2000s, many shanzhai mobile phones used MediaTek chips, since they were inexpensive and were widely available. This transition has made it more difficult for small groups to produce smartphones and other popular electronic products to the same extent that was possible from 2003.

=== Brands ===
Shanzhai manufacturers are often attuned to the local market and add features to their products consistent with local needs. The addition of these grassroots features has helped shanzhai manufacturers increase the public's perception of their legitimacy.

- CECT is a company which offered unauthorized clones or replicas of the Apple iPhone and various Nokia cell phones sold at a fraction of the price of the originals during the 2G and 3G eras. At least one reseller was subject to legal demands from Apple.
- One company that earned notoriety for producing shanzhai smartphones is Goophone, which in 2012 was reported to have filed a patent for the "Goophone i5", a MediaTek-powered clone marketed prior to the real iPhone 5's official release.

=== Internet ===
Due to the growth of internet access in China, websites have been created that attempt to spoof real ones, some with the intent to scam. In 2019, the Ministry of Public Security reported that since 2016 more than 5,000 shanzhai websites had been shut down, alongside 16,000 online groups, and 20,000 accounts. Some of these were said to include deceptive wording in their names, with terms such as "Central" (中央; zhōngyāng) "China" (中国; Zhōngguó or 中华; Zhōnghuá) and "National" (全国; quánguó) used to imitate real government websites and users.

== Regulation ==
The legality of shanzhai products varies. Many products involve illegal forms of copying or design appropriation. Others exist in a grey area where it is unclear whether they violate Chinese intellectual property law. Part of this lack of clear legal status results from China's first-to-file trademark registration system. Trademark registrants do not need to demonstrate their prior use of a trademark. Many shanzhai manufacturers have registered their trademarks and until such marks are challenged in court by the more well-known brand, their legal status is arguable. In some cases brought by foreign brand owners like New Balance, Air Jordan, Brooks, and Muji, the shanzhai manufacturers have prevailed because they registered their similar trademark first.

In January 2011, the Chinese Ministry of Industry and Information Technology and the State Administration of Industry and Commerce announced a crackdown on shanzhai phone sellers and manufacturers. The administration blamed "money-stealing" services that used the cheap phones to steal services using customers' SIM cards. Industry commentator Liu Sheng said that it was more likely to be linked to the country's intellectual property rights protection campaigns.

E-commerce platform Pinduoduo has been significantly criticised in domestic Chinese media for selling shanzhai products. After it was listed on the Nasdaq stock exchange in 2018, China's State Administration for Market Regulation announced probes into the firm based on reports of counterfeit materials available on the platform.

China's 2018 E-Commerce Law makes platform companies jointly liable for counterfeit goods sold through their platforms if they have prior knowledge of such sales. These liability risks have caused platforms to be stricter in their view of shanzhai products.

== Subculture ==
The subculture surrounding shanzhai both covers the subculture that developed among groups producing shanzhai goods, such as in the Pearl River Delta, as well as a more generally-supported subculture based on parodying popular franchises and trends.

Some well-known events include the CCSTV New Year's Gala, Shanzhai Lecture Room (山寨百家讲坛), Shanzhai Olympic Torch Relay (山寨奥运火炬传递), and Shanzhai Nobel Prize (山寨诺贝尔奖). One thing these events have in common is that they all imitate popular yet authoritative events in which the grass-roots communities are usually excluded from participation.

Shanzhai movies are another profit-driven shanzhai phenomenon. These movies usually have low budgets, yet achieve commercial success by parodying, making fun of or borrowing elements from high-end Hollywood blockbuster movies. One of the first shanzhai movies is Ning Hao's Crazy Stone. It imitates the multi-angle shooting, rapid cutting and stunts that are usually used in Hollywood action movies, yet it retains a grass-roots set up. With only a $3 million HKD budget, Crazy Stone achieved a box office revenue of $22 million HKD.

== Critical reception ==
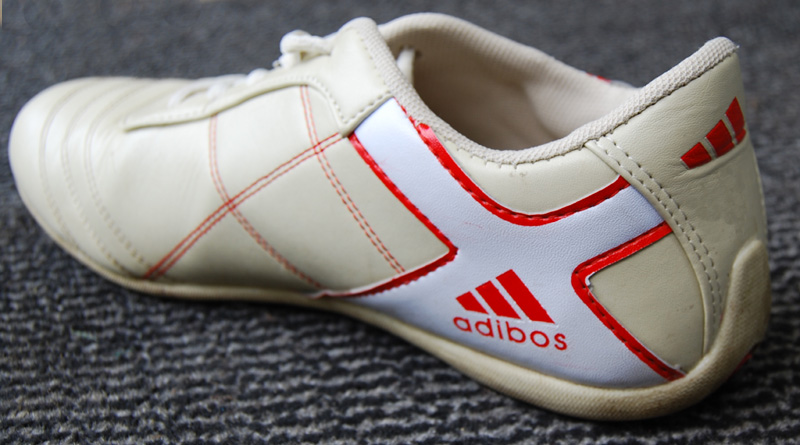
A fake Adidas tennis shoe marketed under the name "Adibos" while using Adidas' logo

In the Western world in countries such as the United States, shanzhai products are often viewed as humorous fakes due to their common use of misspelled or comical names imitating those of real companies. Generally, shanzhai products are viewed in the West as low-quality, cheap, and fake. The influence of this view of shanzhai goods has led to the perception among some that all Chinese-produced goods are low quality or are fakes of foreign goods.

Shanzhai products are negatively perceived by many companies whose products have been counterfeited, both in China and abroad. Within China, companies such as Huawei and Lenovo have faced issues of smaller companies and groups counterfeiting of their goods. Although electronics companies are most prone to this kind of counterfeiting, other industries have faced competition from shanzhai companies as well.

However, philosopher Byung-Chul Han describes shanzhai products as having their own value and benefits:

[Shanzhai cellphones] are actually anything but crude forgeries. In terms of design and function they are hardly inferior to the original. Technological or aesthetic modifications give them their own identity. They are multifunctional and stylish. Shanzhai products are characterized in particular by a high degree of flexibility. For example, they can adapt very quickly to particular needs and situations, which is not possible for products made by large companies because of their long production cycles. The shanzhai fully exploits the situation's potential. For this reason alone it represents a genuinely Chinese phenomenon.

In 2019, the Jinhongye Paper Group successfully won a lawsuit against the Hangzhou Fuyang Paper Company for their shanzhai version of one of Jinhongye's products, which was regarded as an improvement in commercial protections. Jinhongye produces high quality paper marketed as Qingfeng (清风; qīngfēng), which Hangzhou Fuyang imitated in their sale of paper similarly marketed as Qingfeng (清凤; qīngfèng). After a ruling by the Hangzhou Internet Court, Hangzhou Fuyang was forced to pay 1 million RMB to Jinhongye and to stop marketing their paper as Qingfeng.

Business analyst Michael Zakkour believes the phenomena of shanzhai reduces foreign investment in China, discourages foreign companies from marketing copyable products there, and deters them from using Chinese services and technologies that might result in their intellectual property being copied.

== See also ==
- Counterfeit consumer goods
- Bootleg games
- Trademark infringement
- Dafen Village
- Zhing-zhong, a Zimbabwean term for Chinese goods
