= CCST (disambiguation) =

CCST most commonly refers to California Council on Science and Technology.

CCST may also refer to:

- Comboni College for Science and Technology, in Khartoum, Sudan
- Certificate of Completion of Specialist Training
- Certified Control Systems Technician, a certification program of the International Society of Automation

== See also ==
- Ccstv
