= Jaguar Land Rover Halewood =

Jaguar Land Rover factory in England

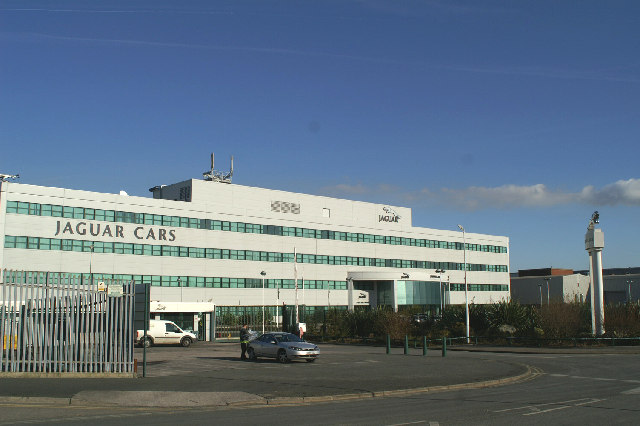
- The plant (with the legend "Jaguar Cars") in February 2006
- Built: 2 October 1963
- Location: Halewood, Merseyside, England
- Coordinates: 53°20′54″N 2°49′58″W
- Industry: Automotive
- Products: Automobiles
- Employees: 4,000
- Owner: Tata Motors

Jaguar Land Rover Halewood is a Jaguar Land Rover factory plant in Halewood, Merseyside, England, and forms the major part of the factory complex in Halewood which is shared with Ford of Britain, who manufacture transmissions at the site, and who opened the site in 1962 as their Halewood Body & Assembly plant.

== History ==
=== 1963–2001 ===
The Halewood plant was originally opened by Ford on 2 October 1963, to build the then small-saloon Ford Anglia. Reflecting pressure on Ford of Britain's principal plant at Dagenham, the Halewood plant was also used for assembling the Ford Corsair between the model's 1964 launch and 1969.

More recently the plant has been associated with the Ford Escort - which replaced the Anglia in 1967. The Capri was also assembled at Halewood from its introduction in 1969. The introduction of the Fiesta in 1976 saw Ford of Europe restructure its entire European operations: all Capri production was moved to the Cologne plant in Germany, whilst Halewood was developed to become (until 1998 along with Saarlouis) Ford's main European production facility for the Escort and derivative Ford Orion models.

The Escort was phased out by Ford in 2000, but the van version of the Escort remained in production at Halewood on a small scale until 2002 when it was replaced by the Turkish built Transit Connect.

=== Since 2001 ===
In 1997, Ford announced plans to replace the Escort with the more radically styled Ford Focus. Furthermore, Ford of Europe announced European production of the Focus would only be carried out at Saarlouis, Germany and Valencia, Spain fuelling rumours that Halewood was due to be closed by Ford. However, Jaguar Cars, owned at the time by Ford, was developing a new mid-sized saloon model which was loosely based on the Ford Mondeo. Ford decided that production of this model, the Jaguar X-Type, would commence at Halewood from 2001 onwards.

In 2007, Halewood commenced production of the second generation Land Rover Freelander model, Freelander 2, and a dirt track test facility was constructed at Halewood specifically for Freelander 2 and subsequent Land Rover models.

In March 2008, Ford finalised a deal to sell Jaguar and Land Rover to Tata Motors. Under the terms of the deal, Ford retained partial ownership of Halewood's transmission plant which it originally operated in collaboration with Getrag, but in March 2021 Ford bought Getrag (now Magma PT) out of the venture, bringing Ford back as a major owner of the Halewood complex.

On 15 July 2009, Jaguar Land Rover (JLR) announced that it would cease production of the X-Type at the end of 2009, with the loss of 300 jobs, and have a three-week shut down between September and December of that year.

On 11 March 2010, the UK Government announced a £27 million grant was to be made available to JLR for the production of an all-new model, the Range Rover Evoque, subject to the condition it is manufactured at Halewood. In July 2011, production of the Range Rover Evoque started. The Evoque became a best-seller, and was critically acclaimed for its concept-car-like styling. Soon, JLR raised the number of employees to 3,000, due to the high demand for the Evoque. In early 2012, JLR announced that they would employ an additional 1,000 staff for Halewood, to meet demand for the Evoque. In August of that year, the plant switched to 24-hour running in order to meet demand.

On 19 June 2014, JLR announced an investment of £200M at Halewood, enabling the launch in 2014 of the new Land Rover Discovery Sport, the first member of an all-new family of Discovery vehicles.

On 16 September 2024, JLR announced an investment of £500M at Halewood in order to upgrade the factory for electric vehicle production.

== Current products ==
- Land Rover Range Rover Evoque (2011–present)
- Land Rover Discovery Sport (2015–present)

== Former products ==
- Ford Anglia (1962–1967)
- Ford Corsair (1964–1969)
- Ford Escort (1967–2002)
- Ford Capri (1968–1976)
- Jaguar X-Type (2000–2009)
- Land Rover Freelander 2 (2006–2014)
