= Landwind X7 =

Chinese compact crossover SUV

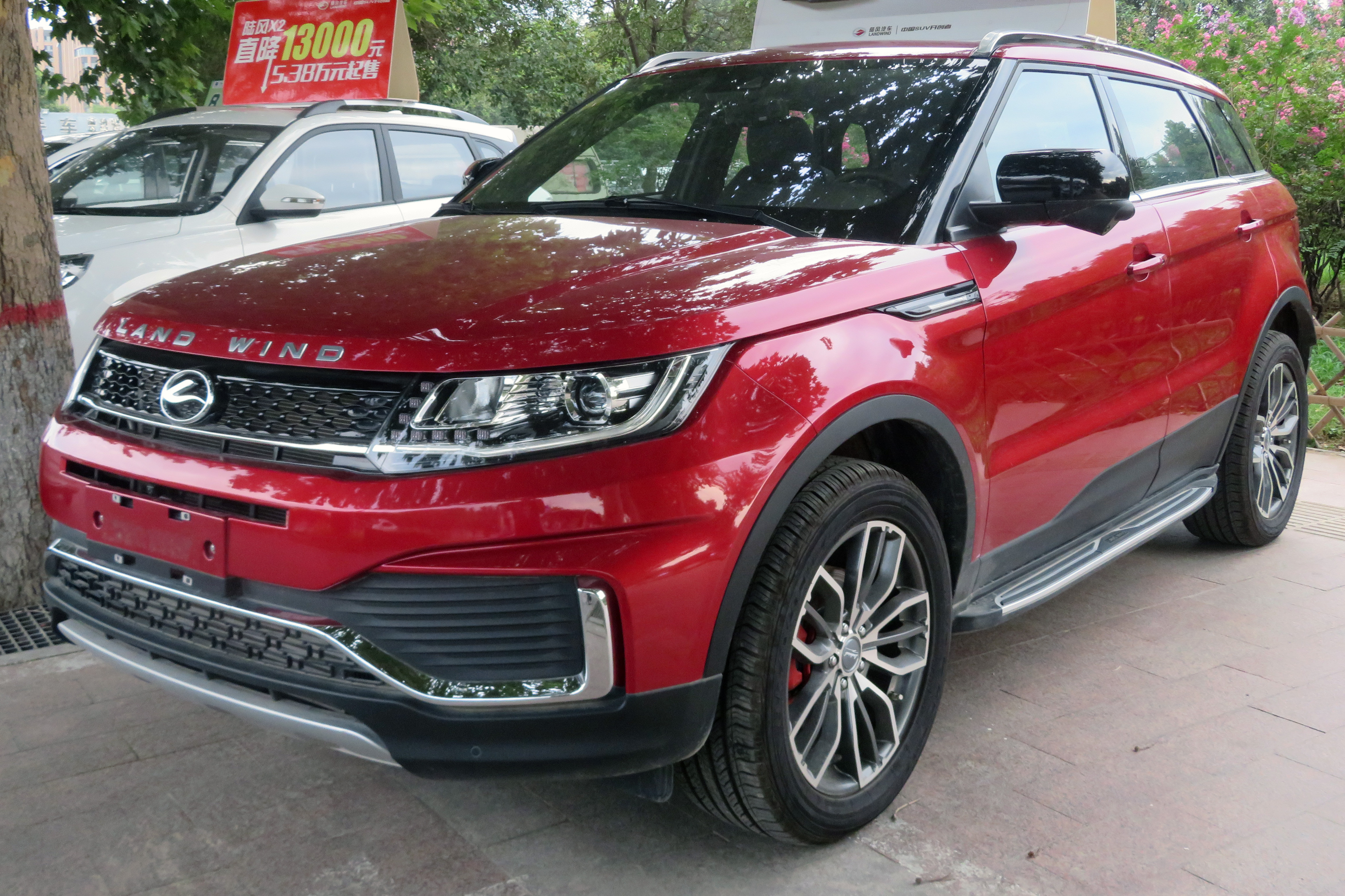
- Facelifted Landwind X7

Overview
- Manufacturer: Landwind
- Production: 2015–2019

Body and chassis
- Class: Compact crossover SUV
- Body style: 5-door SUV
- Layout: Front-engine, front-wheel-drive

Powertrain
- Engine: 1.5 L Ford GTDI turbo I4; 2.0 L 4G63S4T turbo I4
- Transmission: 8-speed automatic

Dimensions
- Wheelbase: 2,670 mm (105 in)
- Length: 4,421 mm (174.1 in)
- Width: 1,911 mm (75.2 in)
- Height: 1,631 mm (64.2 in)
- Curb weight: 1,775 kg (3,913 lb)

Chronology
- Successor: Landwind Rongyao

The Landwind X7 is a compact crossover SUV produced by Chinese car manufacturer Landwind from August 2015 to March 2019. The car received global media attention, because the car was regarded as a cheap copy of the Range Rover Evoque. As a result, Jaguar Land Rover had tried to prevent the Landwind X7 from entering the market. On 22 March 2019, after four years of sales, a Chinese court ruled that Landwind had copied five unique design elements and ordered a cease of production and sales immediately, in addition to paying Jaguar Land Rover compensation.

Before the 2017 facelift, the car was sold with a 2.0 L Mitsubishi-sourced engine, that produces a maximum of 190 PS (140 kW; 187 hp) at 5,500 rpm. The maximum torque is 250 N⋅m (184 lb⋅ft; 25 kg⋅m). After the 2017 update, the engine was replaced by a 1.5 L Ford GTDI engine with 250 N·m that produces 162 PS (119 kW; 160 hp) between 5,400 and 5,700 rpm. The 1.5 L version has a top speed of 109 mph (175 km/h), while the 2.0 L was listed as having a top speed of over 110 mph (177 km/h).

== Background ==
News of the Landwind X7 first emerged in April 2014, when Chinese car website Autohome showed pictures of the car under the name "Landwind E32". It claimed the pictures came from a patent filing by Landwind. The news report also contained specifications of the car. In May, the X7 was first spotted out in the open. The Landwind X7 was officially revealed in November 2014 at the Guangzhou Auto Show. Before it entered the market, the car was also shown at the 2015 edition of Auto Shanghai. Sales of the Landwind X7 in China started in August 2015. It was offered in three trim levels.

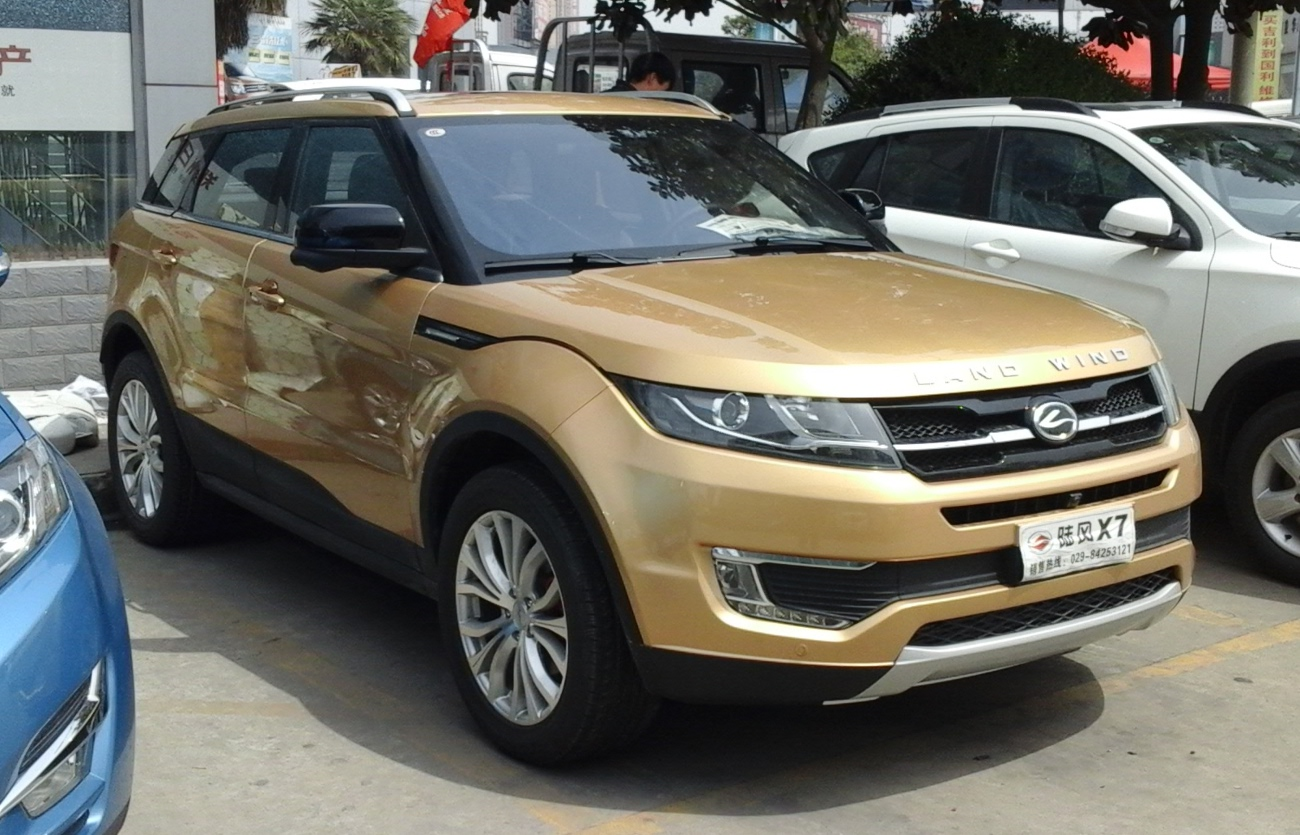
Pre-facelift Landwind X7

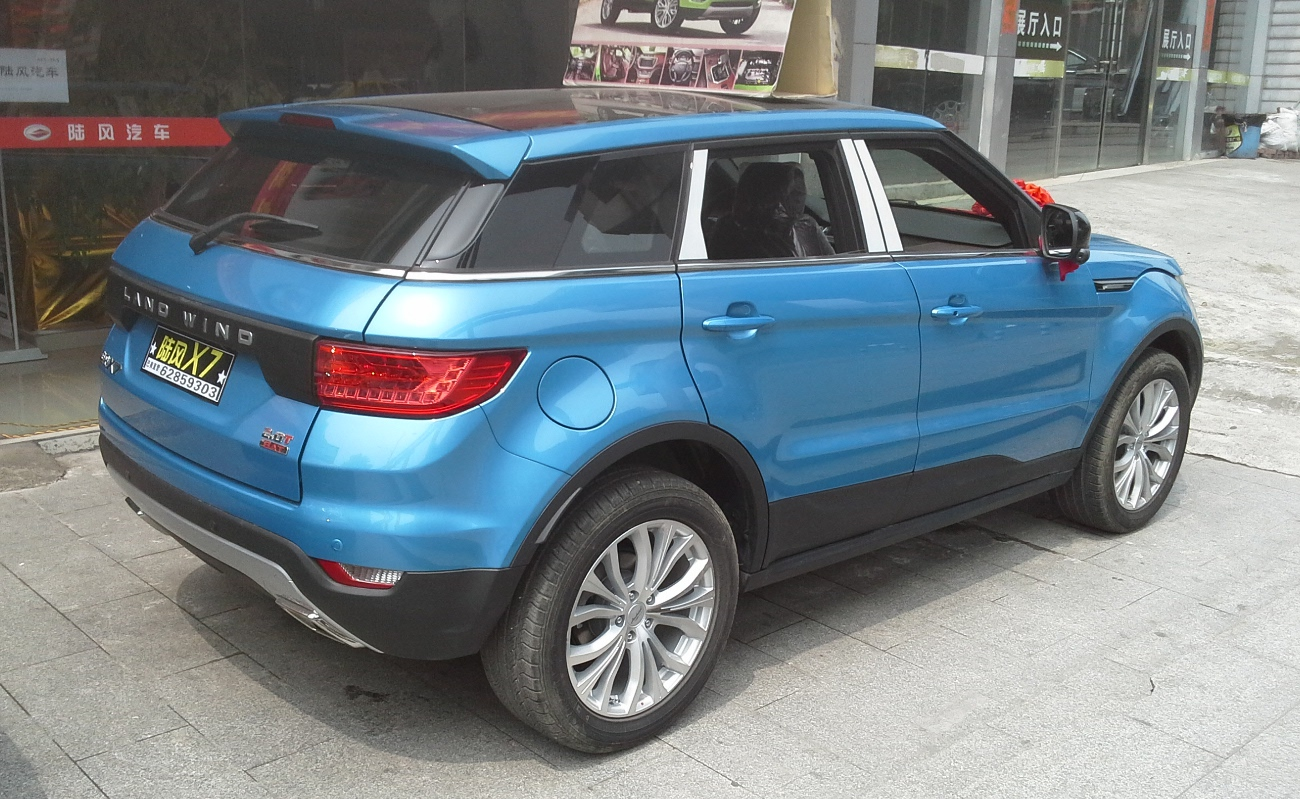
Rear of the pre-facelift X7

=== 2018 facelift ===
A facelifted model was first shown at the 2017 Guangzhou Auto Show in November. The exterior was altered, a new cheaper 1.5-litre engine was introduced, and the transmission was updated. British automobile magazine Autocar wrote the most significant external changes were the new front bumper and the adjusted back. The X7 is sold in five trim levels.

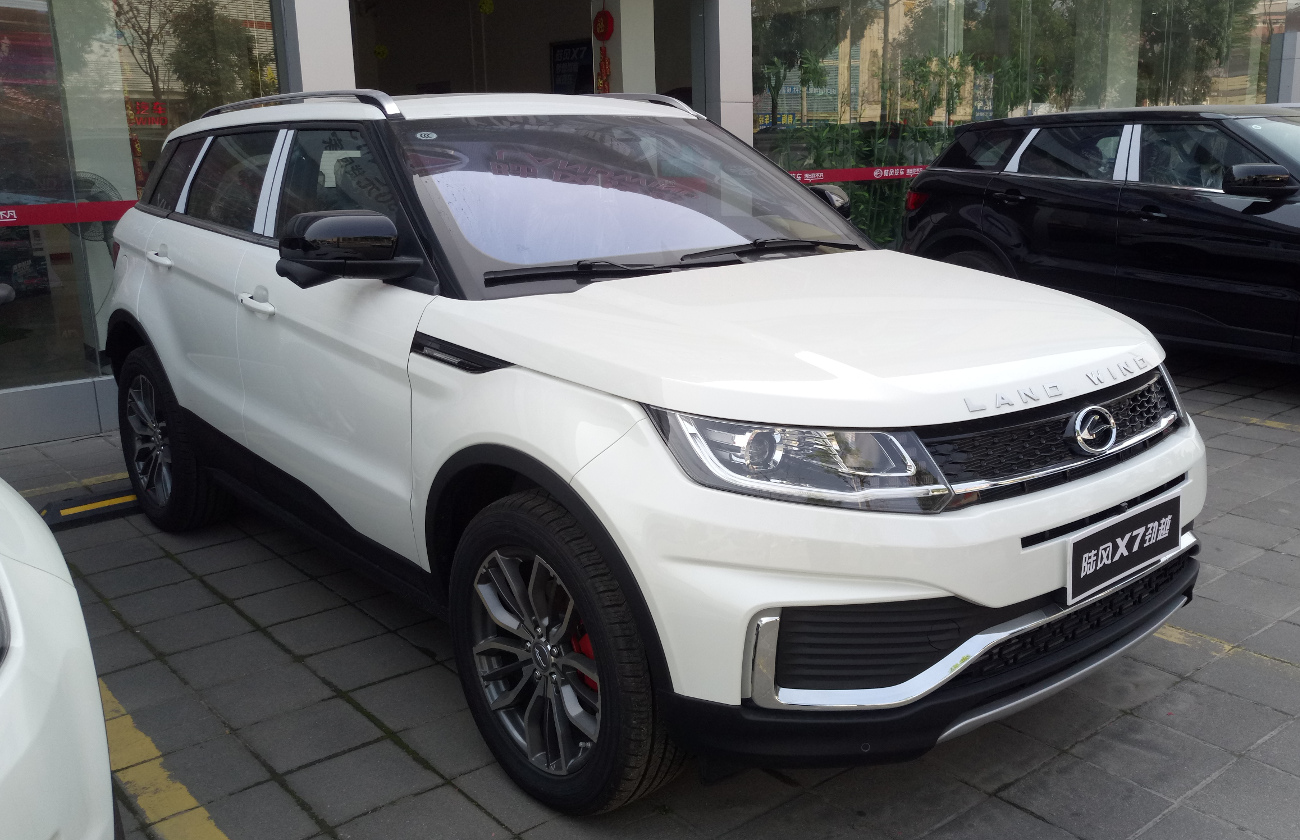
Landwind X7 facelift

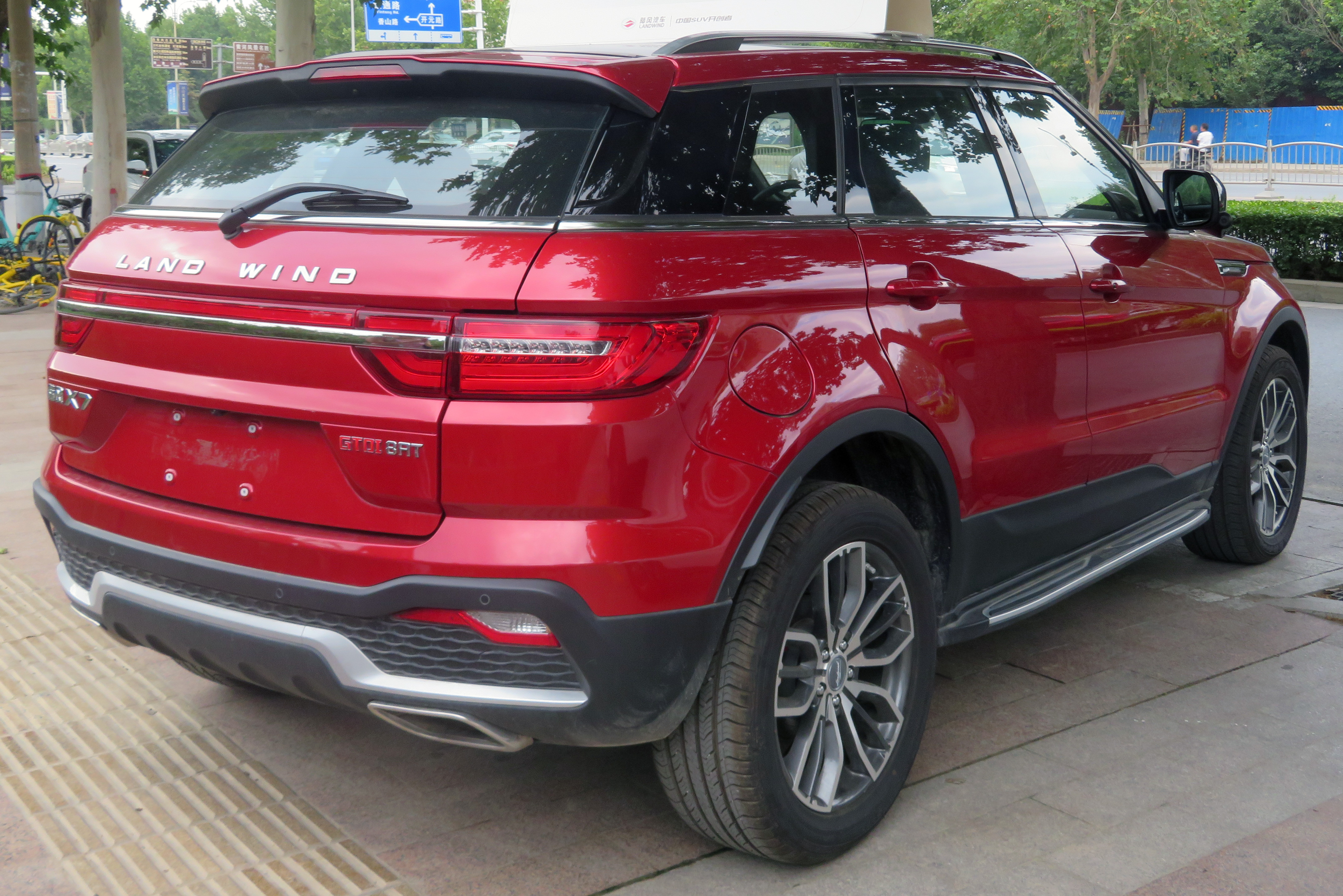
Landwind X7 facelift rear

== Controversy ==
The Landwind X7 received worldwide media attention because of the car's resemblance to the Range Rover Evoque. Although the designs of the cars are similar, the X7 was barely over one third of the price of the Evoque when the former hit the market. Prices of the X7 started at ¥135,000 (US$ 21,700 as of August 2015), while the starting price of the Evoque amounted to ¥398,000 (US$ 64,000 as of August 2015). After a new smaller engine was introduced in 2017, the X7's starting price dropped to just under ¥100,000 (US$ 15,000 as of November 2017). Body kits for the X7 are sold in China in order to make the car look more like the Evoque. Such kits include the grille, logos, and badges of the Evoque.

The unveiling of the X7 came just after Land Rover's parent company Jaguar Land Rover opened a new factory with Chery in the Chinese city Changshu in October 2014. The factory produces the Evoque and the Discovery Sport for the Chinese market. The Evoque was unveiled for the Chinese market in November 2014 at the Guangzhou Auto Show, where the X7 was unveiled as well. Sales of the Evoque in China started in March 2015, five months before sales of the X7 began.

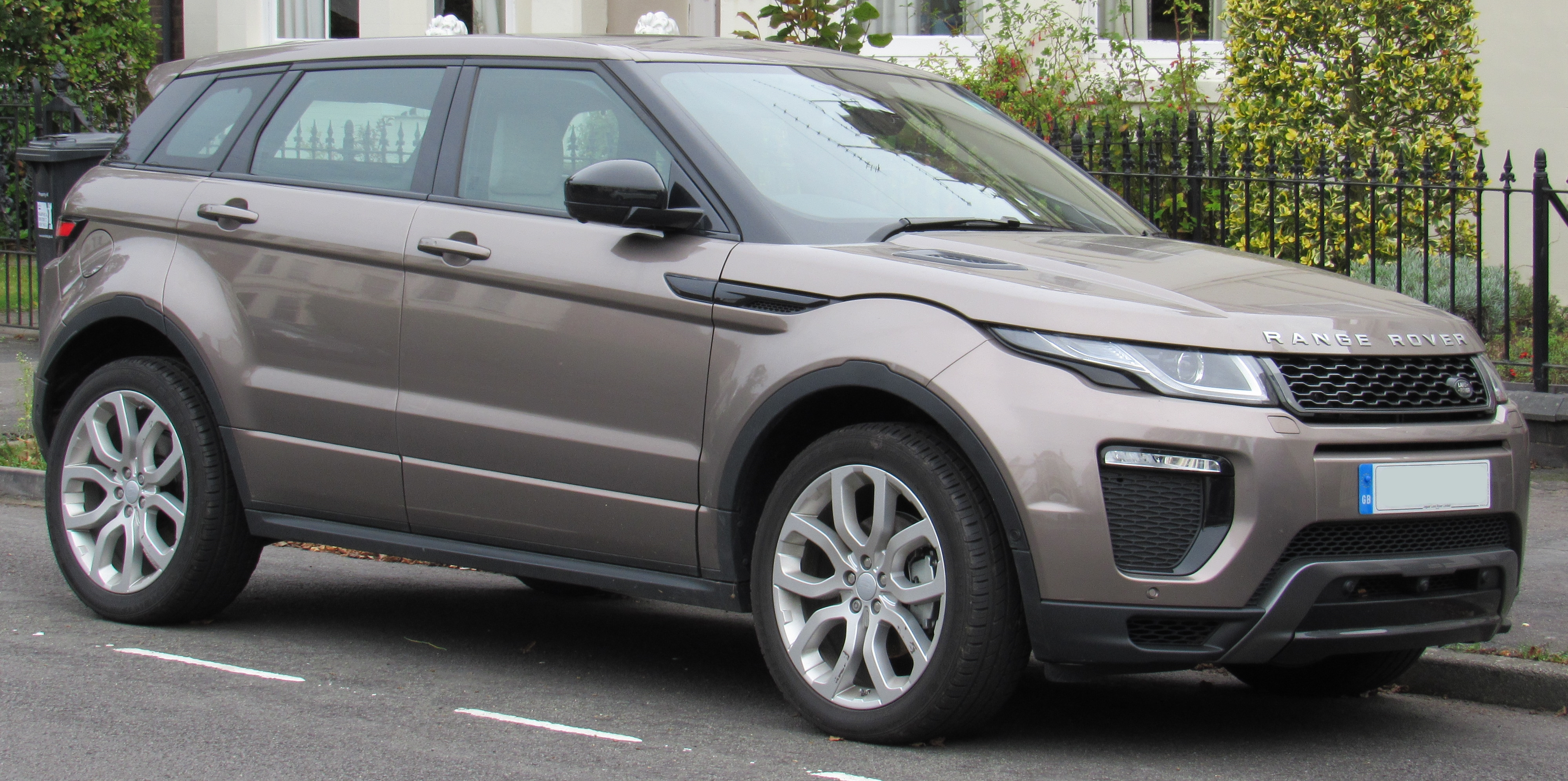
A Range Rover Evoque, which the Landwind X7 was found to be copying the design of

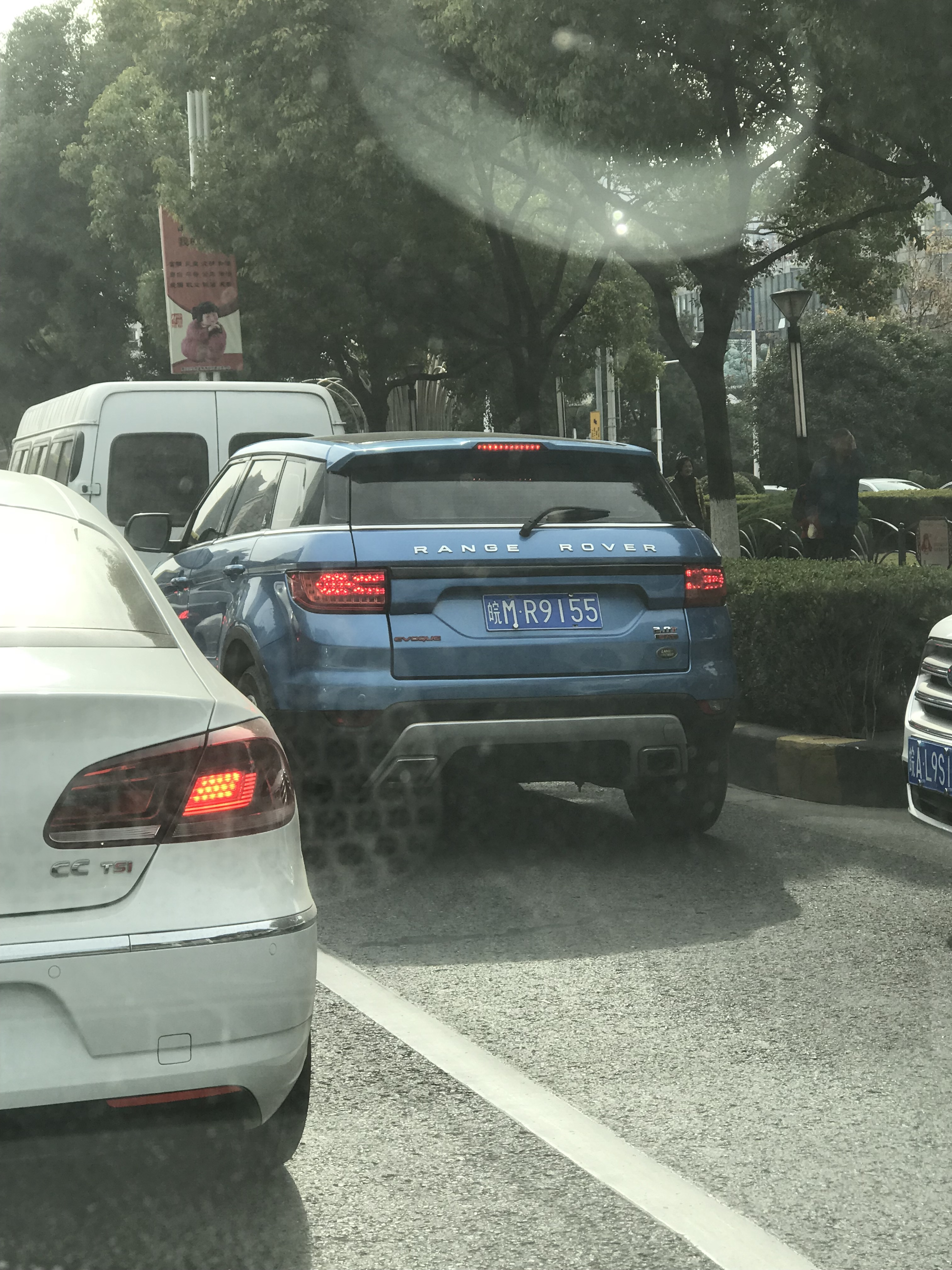
Landwind X7 with full Range Rover Evoque badging

=== Jaguar Land Rover's reaction and legal action ===
Jaguar Land Rover's first response came during the Guangzhou Auto Show in November 2014, when car designer Ian Callum, who works for Jaguar, tweeted pictures of the car and pointed out the resemblance between the X7 and the Evoque. Furthermore, the company stated that it was investigating whether the Evoque's design elements were copied by Jiangling Motors, Landwind's parent company, and that it would "take whatever steps are appropriate to protect its intellectual property." Jaguar Land Rover later went to court in China, but its complaints were dismissed in early 2015. At the 2015 edition of Auto Shanghai, Jaguar Land Rover's CEO Ralf Speth said he regretted "that all of a sudden, copy-paste is coming up again." He added that his company could not do anything, since there were no laws against copying cars.

Both Jaguar Land Rover and Jiangling Motors had filed design patents for the Evoque and the X7, respectively, but both patents were annulled in 2016. The patent for the exterior design of the Evoque in China was declared invalid in April by the Chinese intellectual property regulator, because the car was unveiled before the patent was filed in China in November 2011. The nullification happened at the request of Jiangling Motors. The X7's patent was annulled shortly thereafter at Jaguar Land Rover's request, because the design was too related to the Evoque's design.

In June 2016, Jaguar Land Rover took legal action against Jiangling Motors again in a Beijing court. The car manufacturer blamed Jiangling for copyright infringement and unfair competition. It was a rare move; most non-Chinese car manufacturers choose not to go to court over design copying by Chinese companies because of the small likelihood of winning such lawsuit. In the same month, an unnamed source said to Reuters that Jiangling had agreed with Jaguar Land Rover it would not export the X7 to Brazil. According to that same source, both companies had also discussed what would be acceptable in a design update for the X7. On 22 March 2019, the Beijing Chaoyang District Court ruled in favor of Jaguar Land Rover, saying that Landwind had copied five unique design elements and ordered a cease of production and sales immediately, in addition to paying Jaguar Land Rover compensation.
