= Range Rover Evoque =

British subcompact luxury crossover SUV

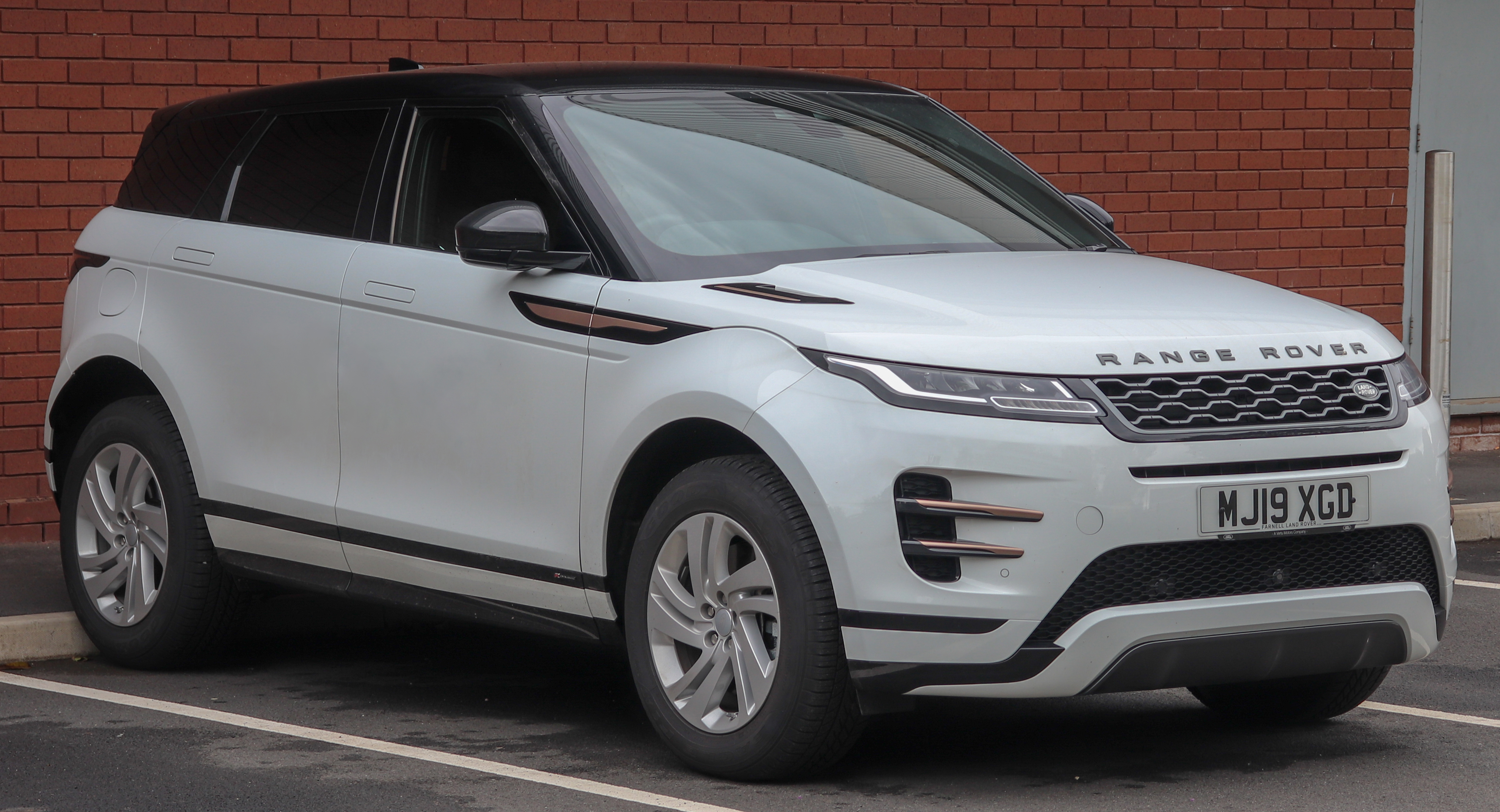
- 2019 Range Rover Evoque R-Dynamic

Overview
- Manufacturer: Land Rover Ltd. (2011–2012); Jaguar Land Rover (2013–present)
- Production: July 2011 – present

Body and chassis
- Class: Subcompact luxury crossover SUV (C)
- Layout: Front-engine, front-wheel-drive; Front-engine, all-wheel-drive

Chronology
- Predecessor: Land Rover Freelander Sport (3-door version)

The Range Rover Evoque (/əˈvoʊk/) is a subcompact luxury crossover SUV developed and produced by Jaguar Land Rover. The original Evoque was a development of the Land Rover LRX concept vehicle, which was unveiled at the North American International Auto Show in January 2008. The first generation Evoque was produced from July 2011 until 2018 in three and five-door versions, with both two-wheel and four-wheel drive. The second generation of the car went into production in 2018.

== First generation (L538; 2011) ==
First generation
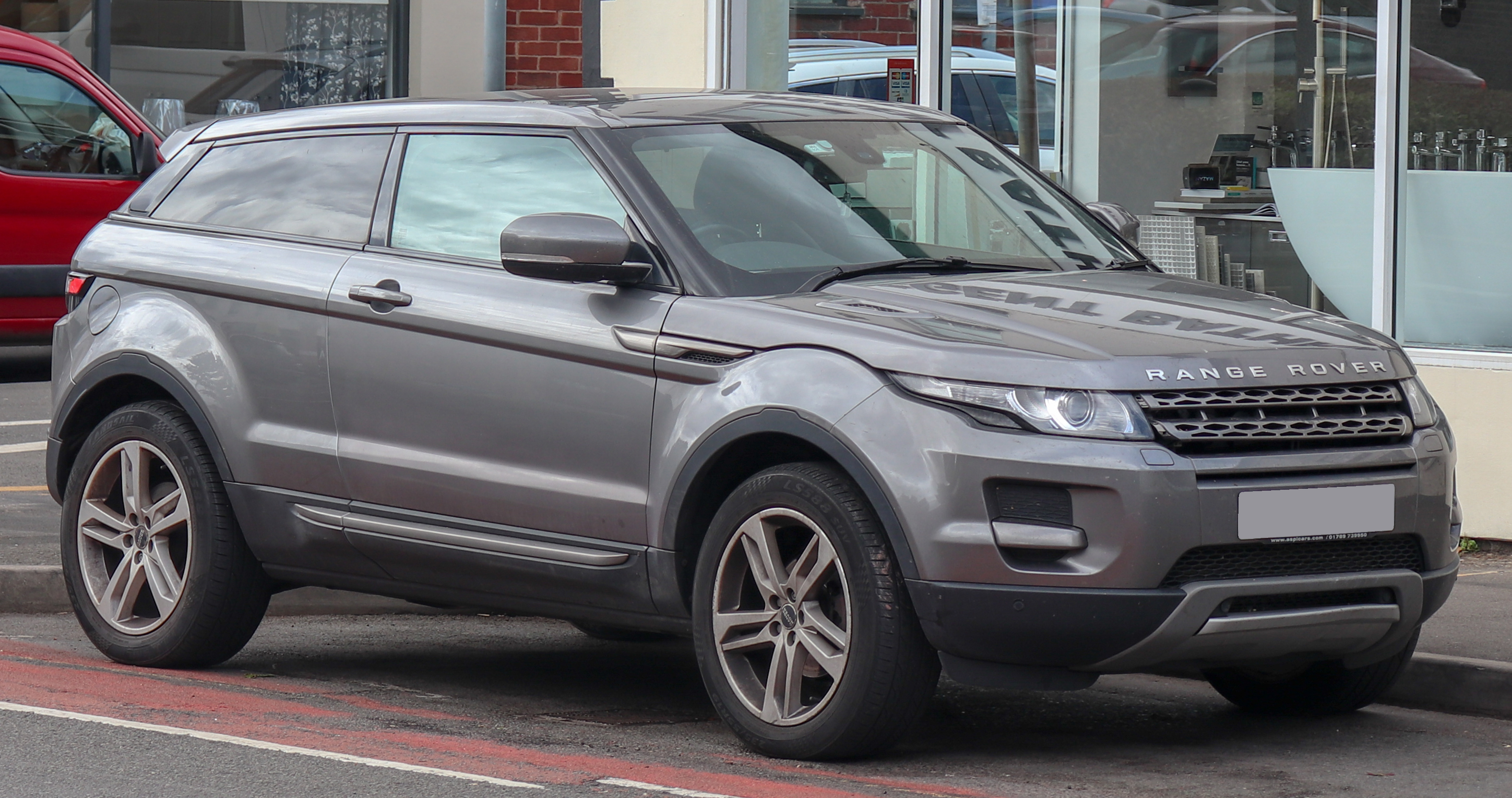

Overview
- Model code: L538
- Production: July 2011 – 2018
- Model years: 2012–2018
- Assembly: United Kingdom: Halewood (Jaguar Land Rover Halewood); China: Changshu (Chery Jaguar Land Rover); India: Pune (Jaguar Land Rover India)
- Designer: Gerry McGovern (2006, 2008)

Body and chassis
- Body style: 3/5-door SUV; 2-door convertible SUV
- Platform: JLR D8
- Related: Land Rover Discovery Sport

Powertrain
- Engine: Petrol: 2.0 L Ford EcoBoost turbo I4; 2.0 L Ingenium turbo I4; Diesel: 2.0 L Ingenium turbo I4; 2.2 L Ford Duratorq turbo I4
- Transmission: 6–speed Getrag M66EH50 manual; 6-Speed Ford Aisin AW F-21 (Aisin Warner TF-81SC) automatic with CommandShift manual shift mode; 9-speed ZF 9HP automatic

Dimensions
- Wheelbase: 2,660 mm (104.7 in)
- Length: 4,371 mm (172.1 in)
- Width: 1,900 mm (74.8 in)
- Height: 3-door: 1,605 mm (63.2 in); 5-door: 1,635 mm (64.4 in)
- Kerb weight: 1,595–1,700 kg (3,516–3,748 lb)

=== Development ===
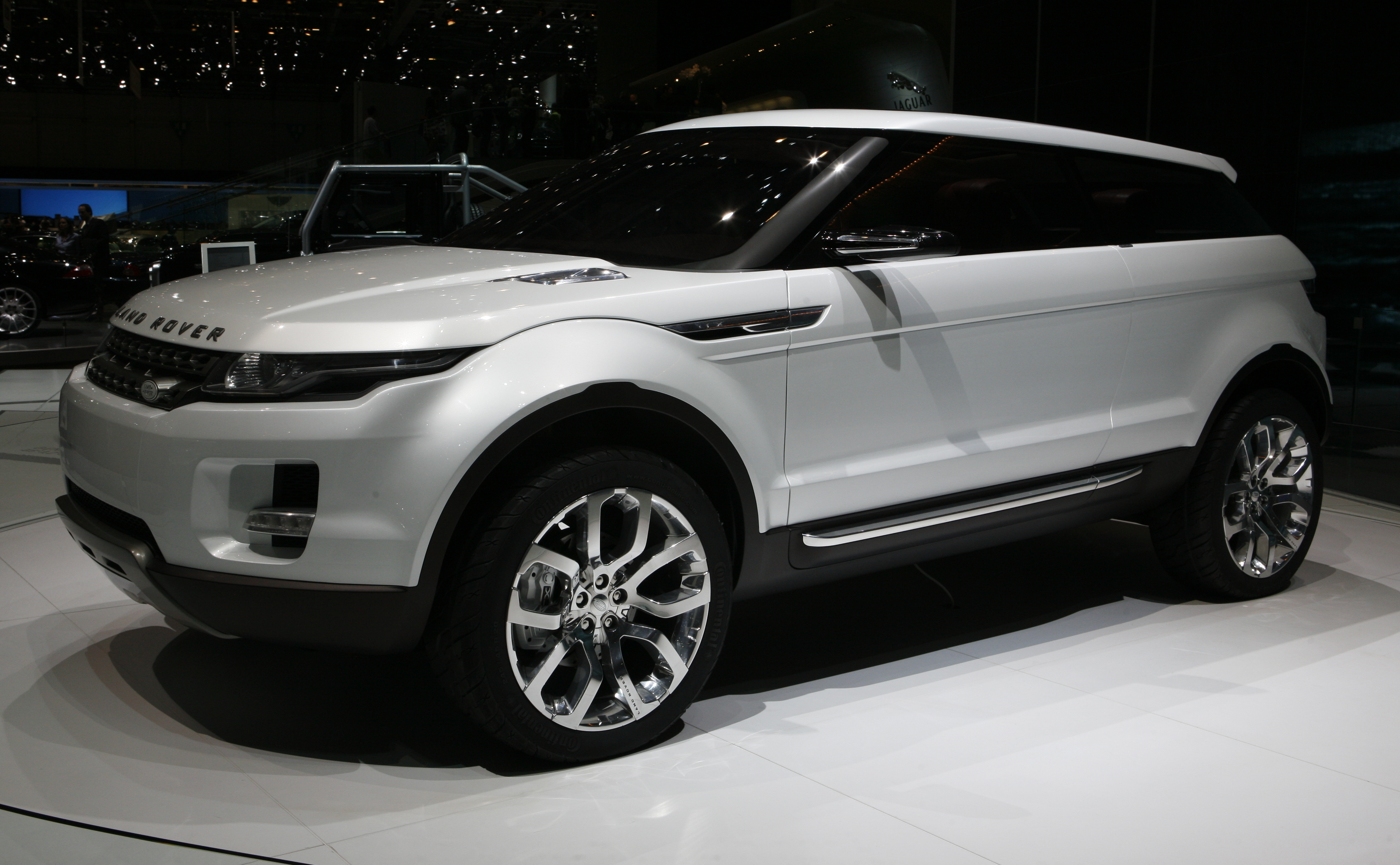
The Land Rover LRX Concept in 2008

The size of the LRX concept vehicle complemented a wide array of efficiency-improving technologies in the form of Land Rover's e_Terrain technologies. These included biofuel compatibility, lightweight construction materials, and technologies such as the removable carbon composite roof panels, regenerative brakes, a stop-start system, along with the ERAD (electric rear axle drive) parallel hybrid powertrain system.

==== ERAD (Electric Rear Axle Drive) system ====
The ERAD system could propel the LRX to speeds up to 20 mph (32 km/h) before the engine was started by an integrated starter generator as part of the stop-start system. ERAD was designed to reduce CO_{2} emissions by an average of 20% under the NEDC test cycle and was expected to offer another 10% reduction in extra-urban driving situations while also optimizing the off-road ability of the vehicle. Land Rover aimed to achieve 120 g/km CO_{2} emissions and fuel economy of 60 mpg_{‑imp} (4.7 L/100 km; 50 mpg_{‑US}) on the European combined cycle with an efficient 2.2-litre turbo-diesel engine based on PSA DW12. The Evoque would become the only four-cylinder vehicle in the Range Rover lineup.

==== Terrain Response System ====
The Terrain Response system was also included offering sport and eco modes in addition to the existing grass, gravel, snow, and sand modes. Typical Land Rover design traits aim at improving off-road performance included a prominent driving position, hill descent control, and useful approach and departure angles. Land Rover's Range Rover styling was visually apparent in the form of the clamshell bonnet, the 'floating' roof, dual-pocket headlamps, and raked roof line.

=== Interior ===
Interior design improvements also changed in the LRX concept, though the interior of the production Evoque changed significantly from the concept LRX. Notable interior features in the LRX included ambient interior lighting that changed according to Terrain Response settings, and vehicle data that were presented to the driver through a 'floating' three-dimensional LCD. An aluminium centre console with an iPhone docking station stretched the length of the cabin, separating the four seats and the tailgate. Seats with open frameworks were used to give the impression of an airy interior, while also creating useful under-seat and under-floor stowage areas. Electric motors folded the rear seats forward, providing enough room for two mountain bikes to be fitted upright, with front wheels removed and stored in dedicated slots in the floor.

=== Market entry ===
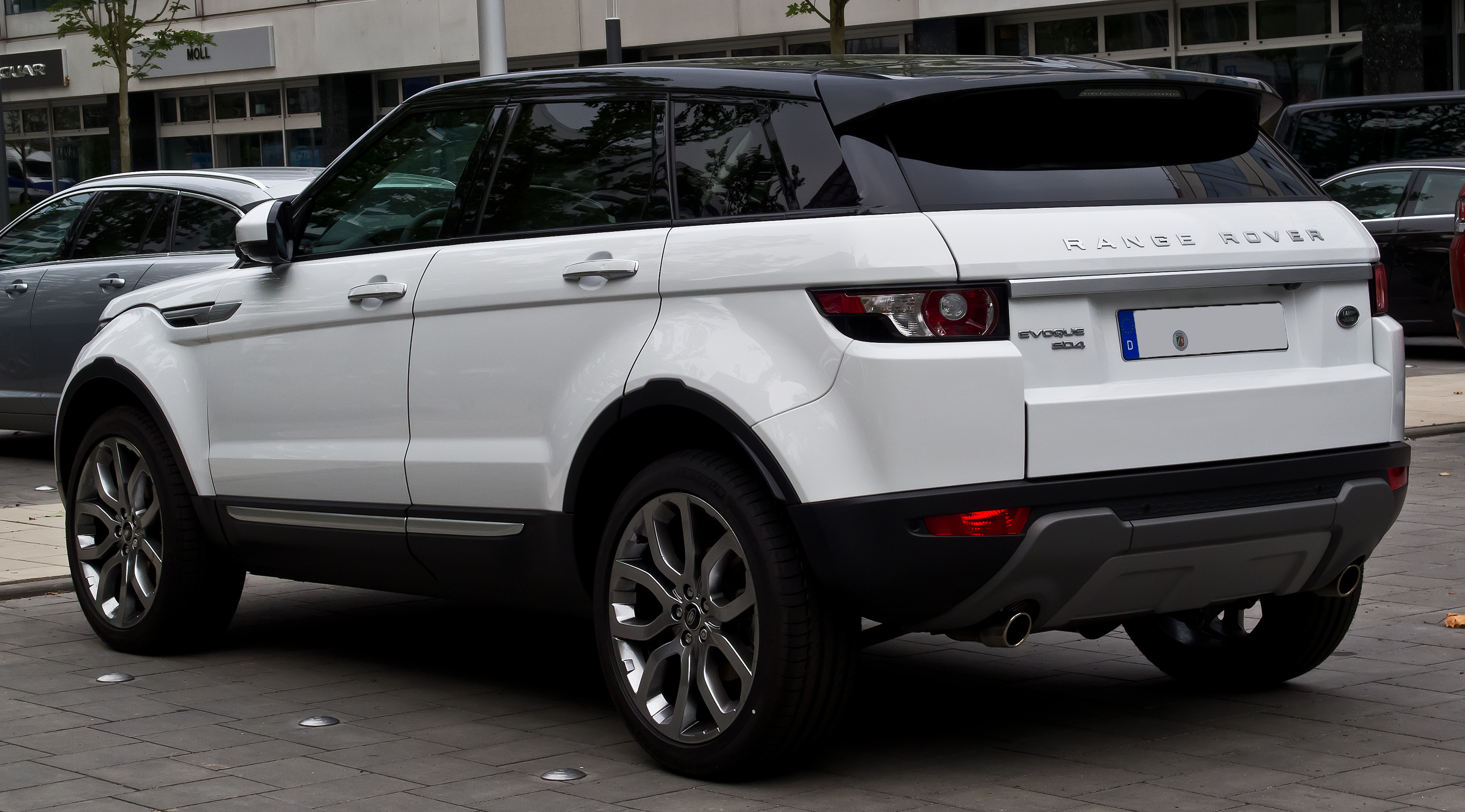
Five-door

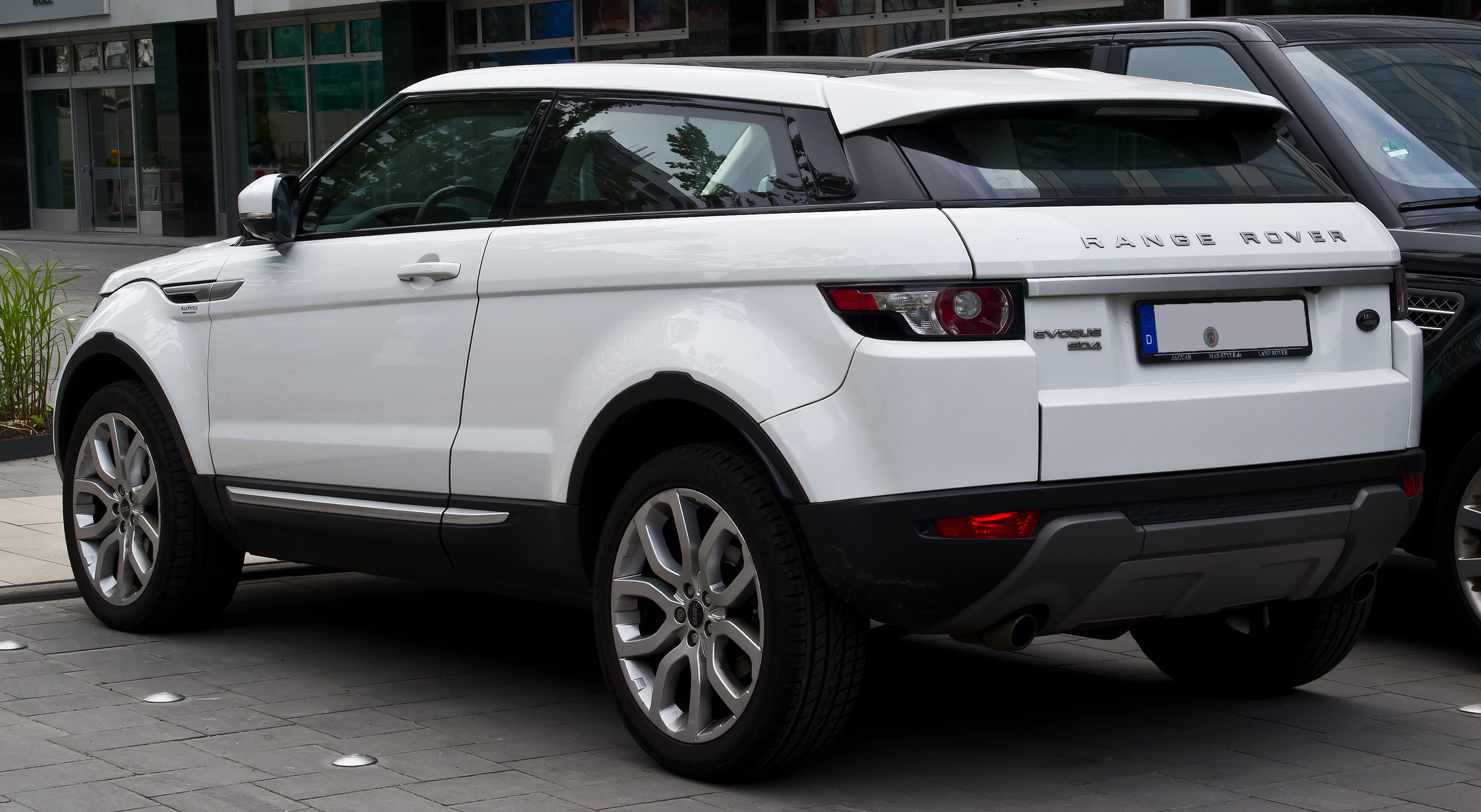
Three-door

The car was launched as two distinct models (later three models for 2016): the five-door Evoque, the three-door Evoque Coupé, and the Convertible Evoque (launched as a June 2016 model). The Coupé model was discontinued early in the 2016 model year, while the five-door and Convertible models remained in production until the 2018 model year.

The production-model Evoque retained nearly identical bodywork from the LRX concept vehicle, including the cabin-length panoramic sun roof. No hybrid powertrain was offered for the L538 Range Rover Evoque.

There were originally three trim levels available with each trim level having two variants as follows: — "Pure", "Pure Tech", "Prestige", "Prestige Lux", "Dynamic" and "Dynamic Lux". Land Rover markets the Pure as the minimalist version rather than the "base model", while the Prestige adds luxury options and the Dynamic focuses more on performance.

=== Body ===
The Evoque uses unibody rather than body on frame construction, with a kerb weight of 1,670 kg (3,680 lb) and an aluminium bonnet and roof, as well as a composite one-piece tailgate.

The Evoque comes in 12 different body colours with three optional contrasting roof colours and five optional wheel choices, though Land Rover offers a "designers choice" of predetermined combinations on most models. The Dynamic model incorporates more aggressive bodywork including a different front fascia and lowered suspension.

The Evoque can be equipped with five exterior cameras.

=== Engines ===
Three engine options were originally available for the Evoque: two 2.2-litre turbodiesels producing either 150 PS (110 kW; 148 bhp), or 190 PS (140 kW; 187 bhp), and a 2-litre 240 PS (177 kW; 237 bhp) turbocharged petrol engine.

Land Rover revealed the Evoque with a 9-speed automatic transmission during the Geneva Motor Show. This new automatic transmission is developed by ZF Friedrichshafen. In addition, the 9-speed automatic transmission's first gear is specially designed for off-road conditions, towing, and adverse on-road conditions. Further, the first gear of a 9-speed automatic transmission is much lower than the first gear of a six-speed automatic. Land Rover did not reveal any further technical details about the new automatic transmission.

Land Rover since have developed their own branded Ingenium engine to adhere to EU6 emissions regulations. Three 2-litre variants are available: eD4 150 PS (110 kW; 148 bhp) turbodiesel two-wheel drive manual gearbox, or TD4 180 PS (132 kW; 178 bhp) permanent four-wheel drive 9-speed automatic, and a 2-litre Si4 240 PS (177 kW; 237 bhp) turbocharged petrol permanent four-wheel drive 9-speed automatic.

==== Fuel economy ====
The manufacturer's fuel-economy estimates for the 2.2-litre diesel engine with manual transmission are 47.1 miles per imperial gallon (6.00 L/100 km; 39.2 mpg_{‑US}) urban and 56.5 miles per imperial gallon (5.00 L/100 km; 47.0 mpg_{‑US}) combined, with CO_{2} emissions of 133 g/km.

For the 2.0-litre petrol engine with automatic transmission, the figures are 23.7 miles per imperial gallon (11.9 L/100 km; 19.7 mpg_{‑US}) urban and 32.5 miles per imperial gallon (8.7 L/100 km; 27.1 mpg_{‑US}) combined, with 199 g/km CO_{2}.

United States Environmental Protection Agency fuel-economy estimates have been stated as being 19 miles per US gallon (12 L/100 km; 23 mpg_{‑imp}) in the city and 28 miles per US gallon (8.4 L/100 km; 34 mpg_{‑imp}) on highways for the 2-litre petrol version.

=== Off-road performance ===
The Evoque has 215 mm (8.5 in) of ground clearance, 25° approach and 33° departure angles, and a 500 mm (19.7 in) wading depth.

The Evoque was equipped with either two-wheel drive or a generation IV Haldex permanent four-wheel drive system until the 2014 model year update when the Haldex system was replaced by two optional All-Wheel Drive Systems (Standard Driveline or Active Driveline) by GKN Driveline. The Evoque also comes standard with Land Rover's latest version of Terrain Response, which maximises traction in a variety of conditions by altering throttle response, power distribution, and suspension settings. The Terrain Response system also includes electronic stability control, roll stability control, traction control, and an optional hill-descent control that automatically applies braking to control speed when moving down an incline.

A third-generation MagneRide suspension system is also available, which works by magnetising iron particles inside the suspension fluid to quickly adapt shock absorber firmness to road changes.

=== Interior ===
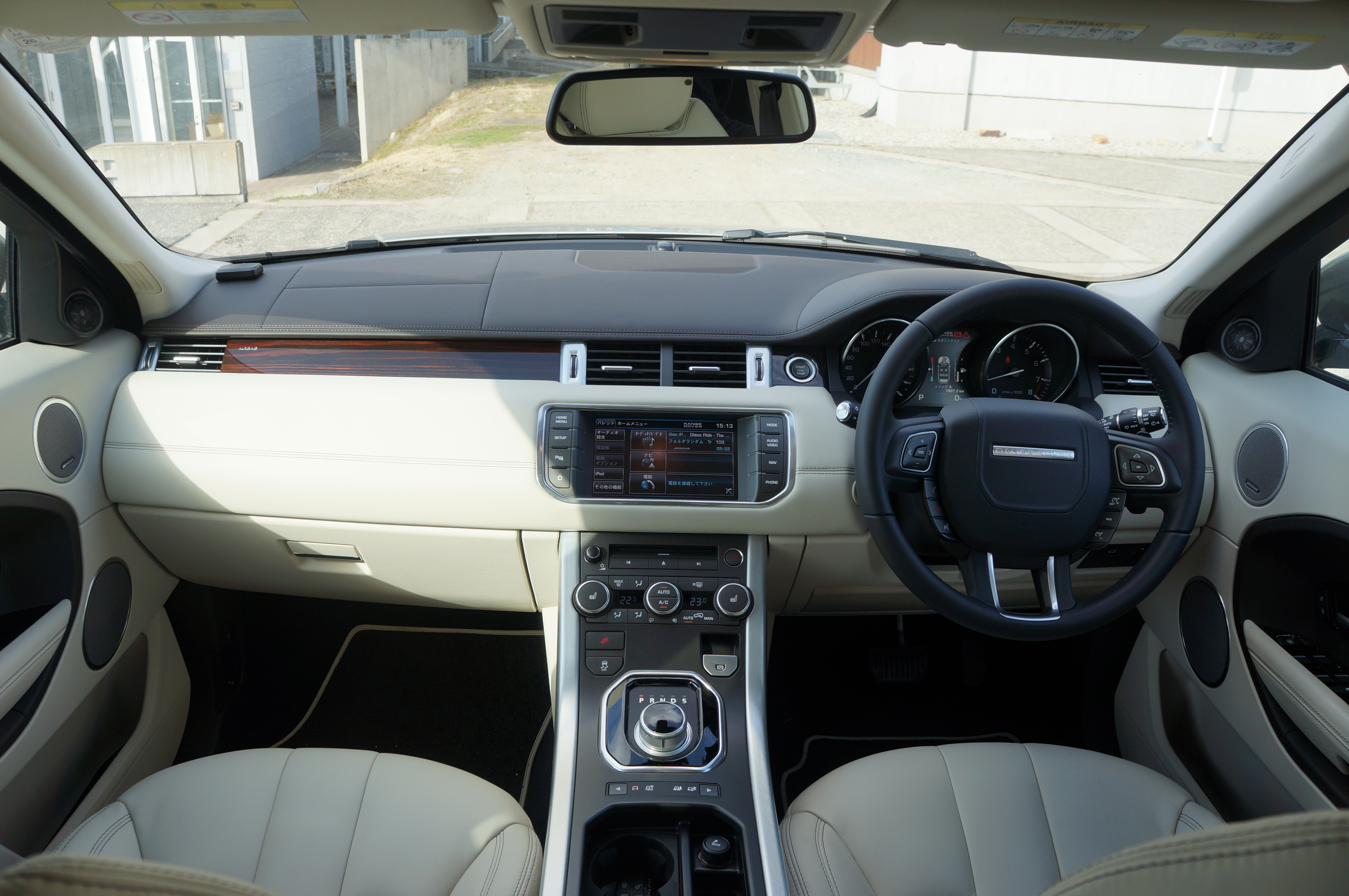
Interior

Standard equipment includes accent lighting located throughout the interior, push button start and a 5–inch driver's information display.

Options include a panoramic fixed sunroof; heated seating, steering wheel, and windscreen wipers; and an 8–inch touch screen entertainment system that can display separate images to both the driver and front passenger.

There are 12 interior colour choices, various wood and metal trims and three optional contrasting roof treatments.

=== Safety ===
The European New Car Assessment Programme (Euro NCAP) awarded the Evoque a five–star car safety rating, earning the following ratings for each criterion. The tested model was a right-hand drive, five-door with a 2.2 diesel engine registered in 2011:

Euro NCAP test results* Range Rover Evoque (2011)
| Test | Points | % |
|---|---|---|
| Overall: | 5 /5 stars | |
| Adult occupant: | 31 | 86% |
| Child occupant: | 37 | 75% |
| Pedestrian: | 15 | 41% |
| Safety assist: | 6 | 86% |

The Australasian New Car Assessment Program (ANCAP) rated the Evoque four out of five stars for crash safety, scoring 32.49 out of 37. This score takes into account the 12.39 out of 16 rating in the frontal offset crash test, and the score of 16 out of 16 received for the side impact test.

ANCAP test results* Range Rover Evoque 5 door diesel variants (2011)
| Test | Score |
|---|---|
| Overall | 4 /5 stars |
| Frontal offset | 12.39/16 |
| Side impact | 16/16 |
| Pole | 2/2 |
| Seat belt reminders | 3/3 |
| Whiplash protection | Not assessed |
| Pedestrian protection | Marginal |
| Electronic stability control | Standard |

=== Update, editions and variant ===
==== 2016 model year update (facelift) (2016–2018) ====
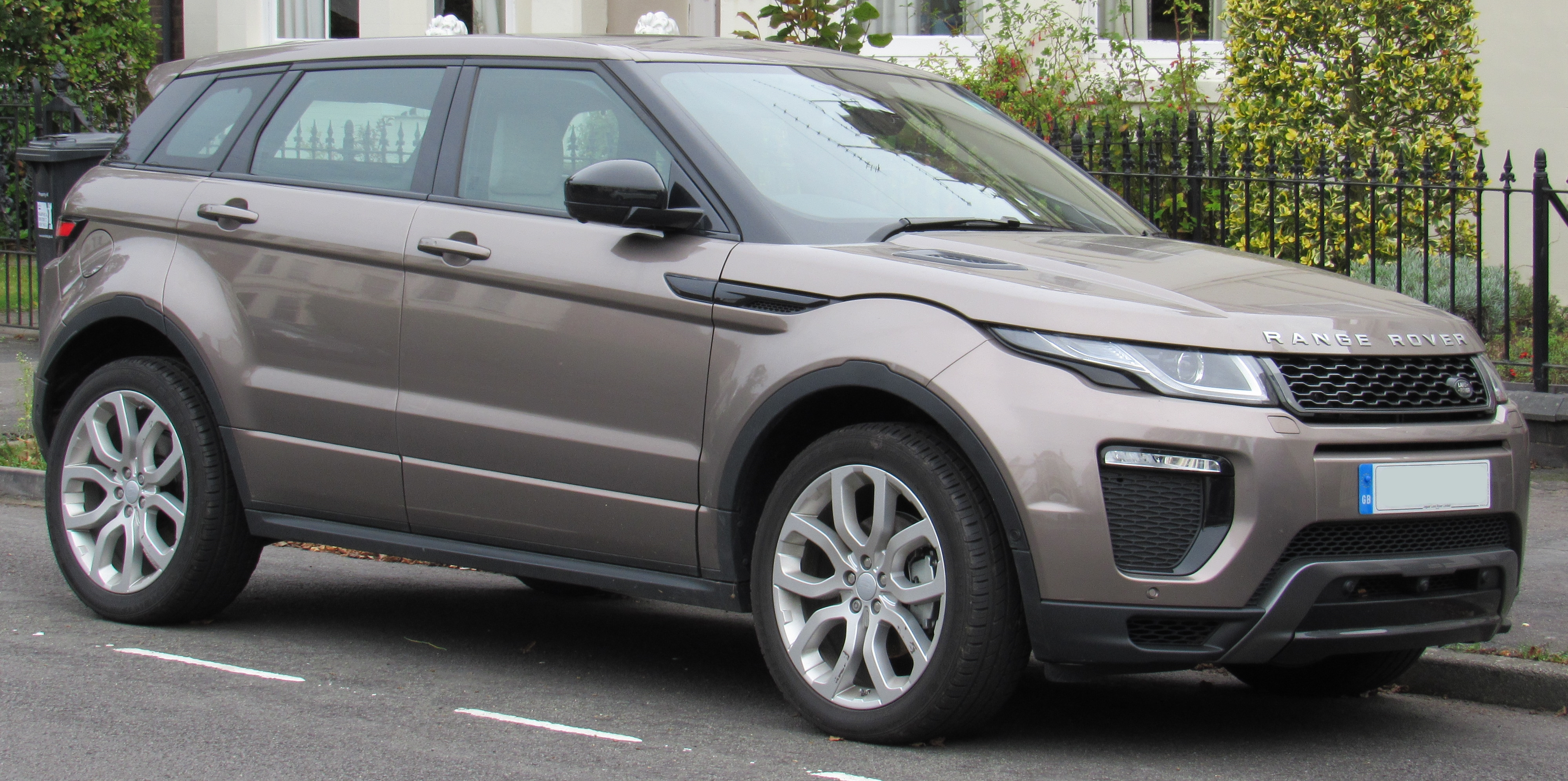

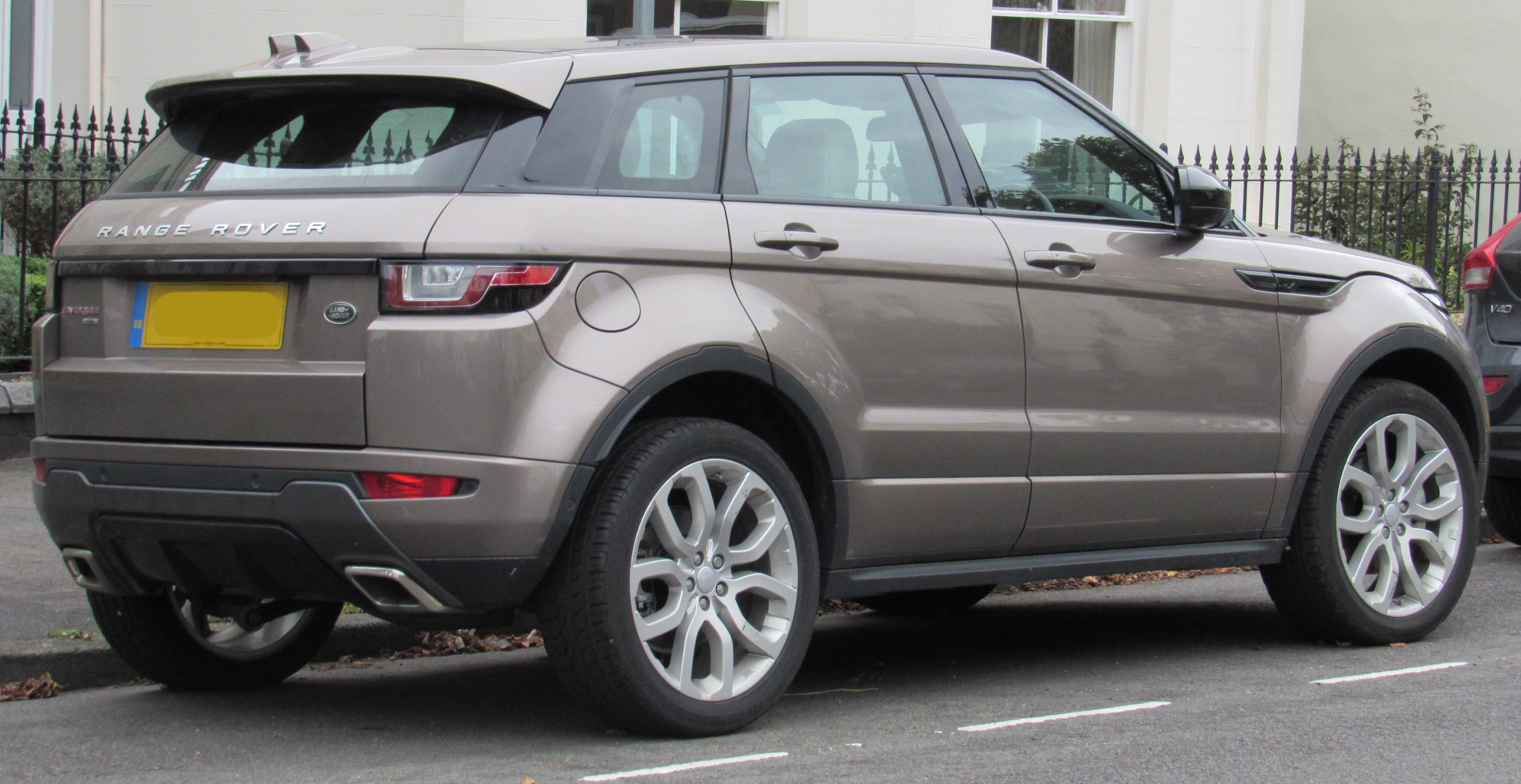
Range Rover Evoque HSE (facelift)

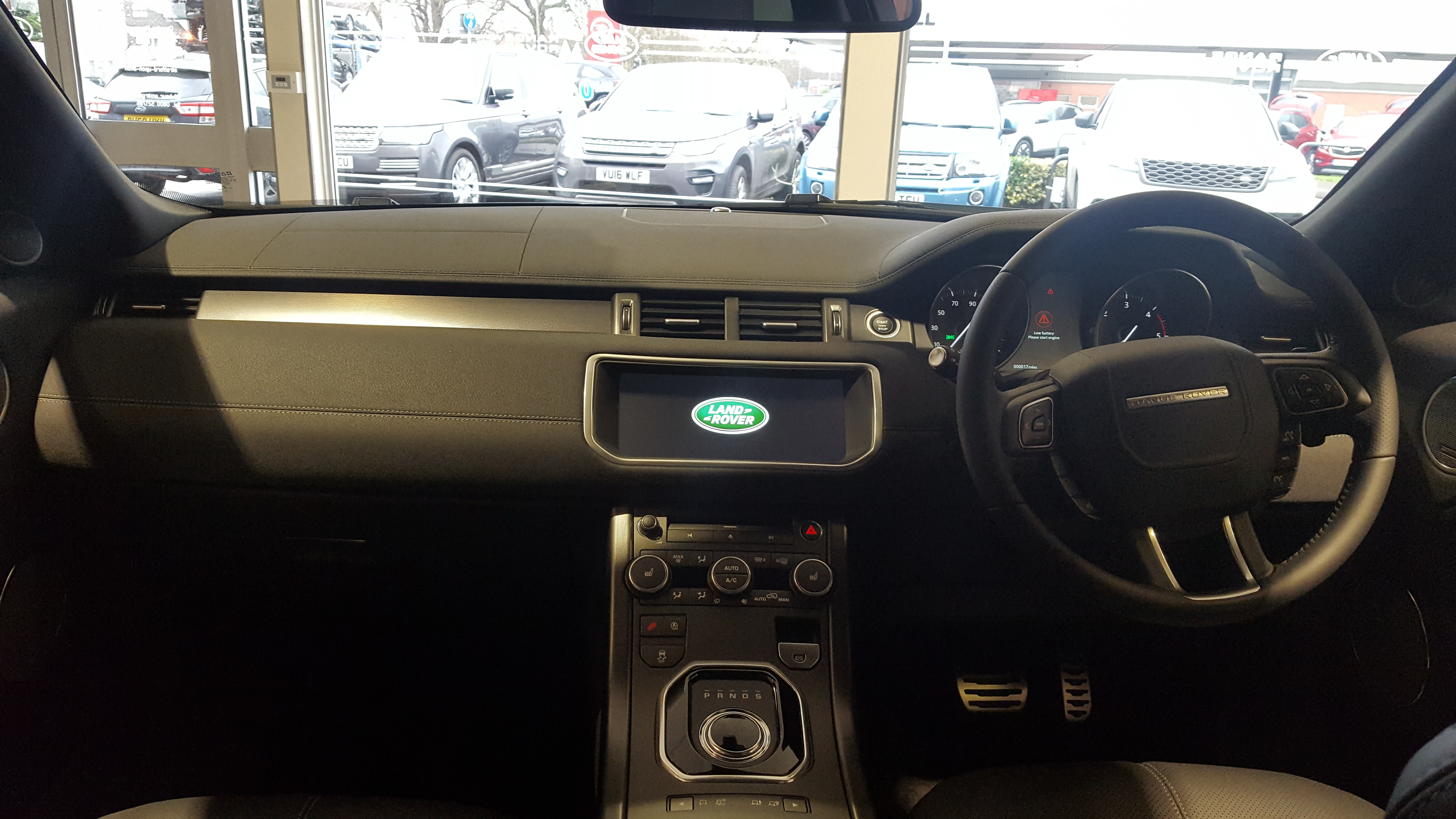
Interior (facelift)

Changes include: Externally the only visible differences are the front fog light position moves up and brake light above rear screen is slimmer. Internally the 10 inch centre screen was an option then became standard, new technology includes driver assistance and the convenience features (Park Exit (to automatically exit parallel parking bays), Perpendicular Park (to position the car centrally in parking bays), Closing Vehicle Sensing and Reverse Traffic Detection (to warn drivers of oncoming traffic), Lane Departure Warning, Traffic Sign Recognition and Wade Sensing), optional Land Rover InControl connected car system, new colour options for exterior and interior, four new alloy wheel styles, a new style of Land Rover badge on the grille, wheel centres and tailgate.

A new compared to previous years is the optional Land Rover Active Driveline on-demand four-wheel drive system, which is manufactured by GKN Driveline. The Active Driveline system works by disconnecting all of the major all wheel drive components from the gearbox, rather than at the central coupling. The system also features torque vectoring to direct power to individual wheels. GKN Driveline also supplies the all-wheel drive system for the Standard Driveline thus replacing the Haldex system.

Early models include a choice of three engines (2.2 diesel 150PS engine, 2.2 diesel 190PS engine or 2.0 Petrol 240PS engine). Active Driveline became initially available on Si4 petrol engine.

UK models went on sale in Q4 2013.

Range Rover Evoque Coupe (2011–2016)

The Coupe was the first vehicle off the production line and this car sits in the British Motor Museum, Warwickshire, UK. Built from 2011, the sales of the Coupe were at their best in 2013, topping 3%. Subsequently, it was decided to stop production. All new chassis, engine and technology were across all models of the Evoque in 2016, the Coupe then stopped production early 2016 to make way for the Convertible in June. The early 2016 Coupe models were short in production numbers.

==== Range Rover Evoque Autobiography Dynamic (2013–2018) ====
Available in coupé or 5-door body styles, it is a version of the Range Rover Evoque with a 285PS/400Nm 2.0-litre petrol engine, revised chassis for sharper handling, 350mm front brake discs, Land Rover InControl Apps, forged 20-inch alloy wheels in satin technical grey, exterior trim components detailed in Santorini black, new design of grille, lower front valance, new fog light surrounds, 'Autobiography' illuminated tread plates, ingot badging on the tailgate and front wing vents, darkened headlights, clear tail lamps, Santorini black contrast roof, body-colour side trim visually lowers the vehicle a dynamic plus leather interior with either sports or premium climate seats in a range of four colours, Autobiography embossed logo at front seats, dashboard with dark brushed aluminium trim, Active driveline and torque vectoring by braking.

==== Range Rover Evoque Pearl Noir Edition (2014–2018) ====
The Pearl Noir Special Edition is a version of the Range Rover Evoque for the Hong Kong market, with a 2-litre Si4 (240PS) engine, ZF 9-speed automatic transmission, 8-inch touch screen, Meridian audio system, leather interior upholstery, Panoramic roof, 20-inch Style 9 alloy wheels in matte black, Xenon headlamps with black lamp shade, black exhaust tip, black rear diffuser, black interior and gold body colour.

==== Range Rover Evoque Convertible (2017–2018) ====
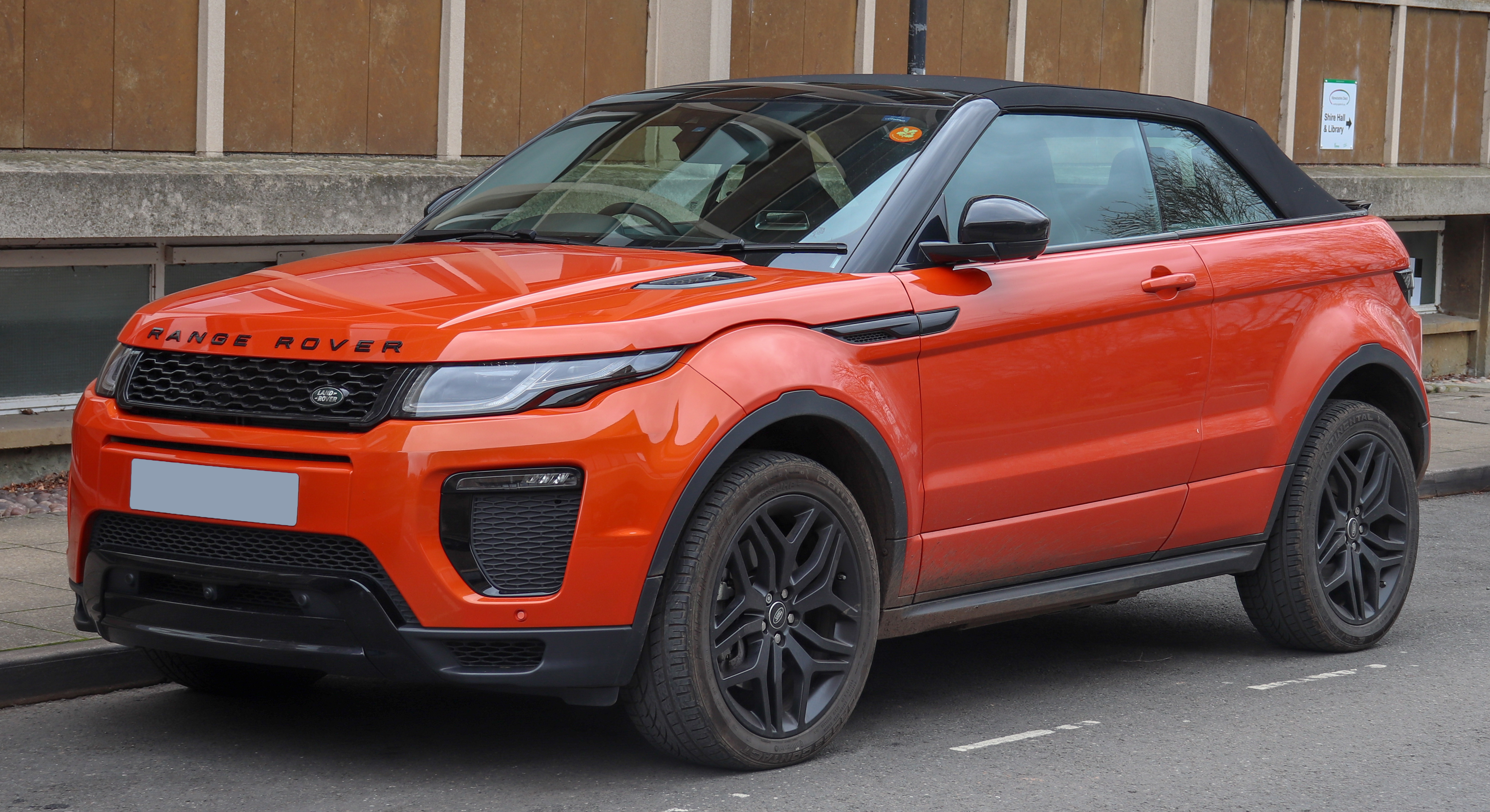
Front view

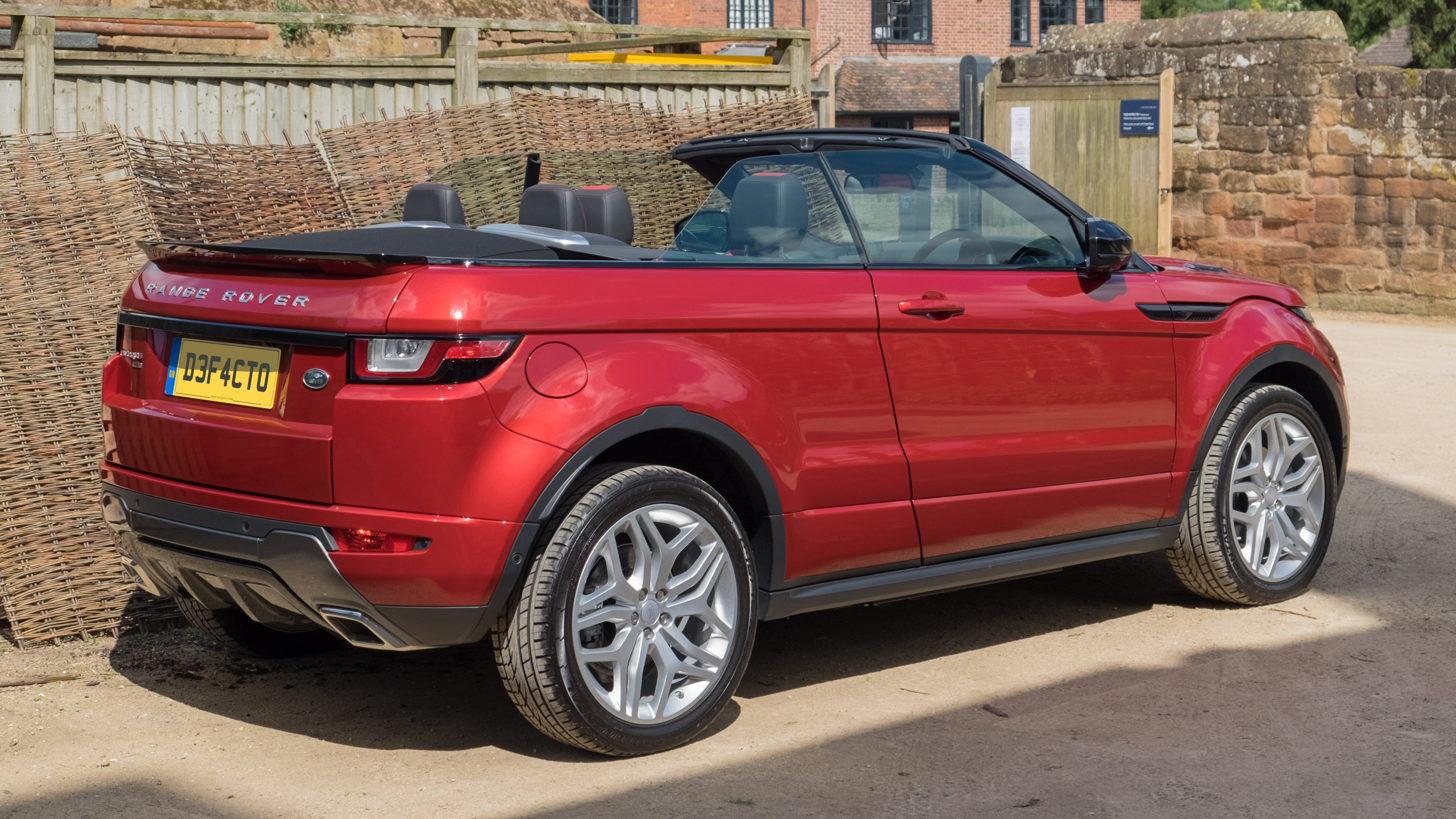
Rear view

Based on the three-door Evoque Coupé, it has four seats, a power-retractable soft top roof, 20-inch wheels. The Evoque's hatchback has been replaced with a drop-down tailgate. Land Rover has stated that: "The new convertible body has been achieved with minimum changes to weight and torsional rigidity. Land Rover has also stated that the Convertible Concept is as off-road ready as the regular Evoque. The vehicle was unveiled in 2012 at the Geneva Motor Show. After debuting as the 2012 Land Rover Range Rover Evoque Convertible Concept, the production version was revealed in November 2015, while the model years start from 2017.

Land Rover design chief, Gerry McGovern said "It's the first luxury SUV convertible. There have been other convertible SUVs, but not a luxury execution. We'll take buyers from other luxury cars. Most Evoque customers came from premium brands, but had never owned an SUV before".

=== Production ===
On 11 March 2009, the British government announced a £27 million grant to Land Rover to produce an all-new model, subject to the conditions that the Evoque would be manufactured at the Jaguar Land Rover Halewood assembly facility in Liverpool.

Production of the Evoque started on 4 July 2011, at Land Rover's Halewood manufacturing plant in Liverpool, with the first customer deliveries in September. The Evoque platform, named LR-MS, is loosely based on the Ford EUCD platform (which was used on the company's Freelander 2) but 90% of its parts were redesigned.

The British Motor Industry Heritage Trust was given the first vehicle off the line to add to their collection, held at the Heritage Motor Centre in Gaydon, but Land Rover ambassador Zara Phillips became the first person to take delivery of a new Range Rover Evoque.

=== Reception ===
Prior to going on sale in September 2011, Land Rover had 18,000 pre-orders for the Evoque. By July 2012, a year after production began, the company had sold 80,000 units. Land Rover later revealed that they had sold nearly 90,000 units.

Since its launch the Evoque has received acclaim from the automotive press including several "best of" awards. The popular British car show Top Gear, view the Evoque as the softening of the Land Rover image, though Top Gear were impressed with the Evoque's off-road capabilities. Motor Trend contends that the Evoque is the necessary evolution of the Land Rover brand to stay competitive in a more environmentally conscious marketplace.

The Evoque has been awarded several national and international awards including:

- 2012 North American Truck of the Year
- 2012 World Design Car of the Year, part of the World Car of the Year awards
- 2012 Women's Overall World Car of The Year and Women's Top World Luxury Car of the Year
- 2012 Best of the Best/Truck by AutoWeek magazine
- 2012 SUV of the Year by Motor Trend in 2011
- 2011 Auto Express Car of the Year
- 2011 Car of the Year by Top Gear, "SUV of the Year 2011" and "Jeremy's Car of the Year".
- 2010 Best production car by Car Design News in 2010

Criticism has been made of the Evoque's voice interface and the entertainment system's touchscreen.

=== Chinese copy controversy ===
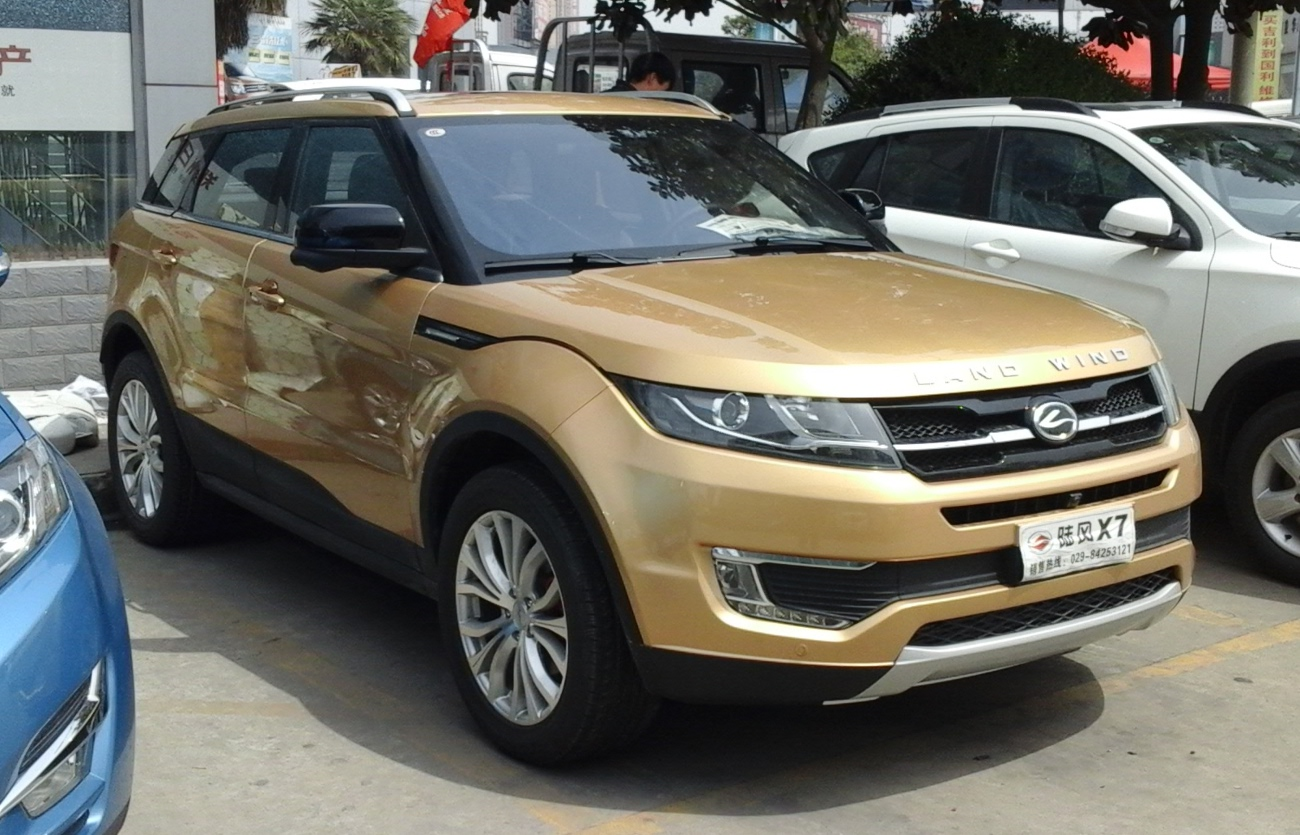
Landwind X7

In November 2014, Chinese automotive joint-venture company Landwind officially revealed the Landwind X7 at the Guangzhou Auto Show, which bears a very close resemblance to the Evoque. JLR complained to authorities in order to try to stop its production. Initially, Chinese authorities did not take any action regarding Land Rover's request; however, on 22 March 2019, after four years of X7 sales, a Chinese court ruled that Landwind had copied five unique design elements and ordered a cease of production and sales immediately, in addition to paying Jaguar Land Rover compensation.

== Second generation (L551; 2018) ==
Second generation
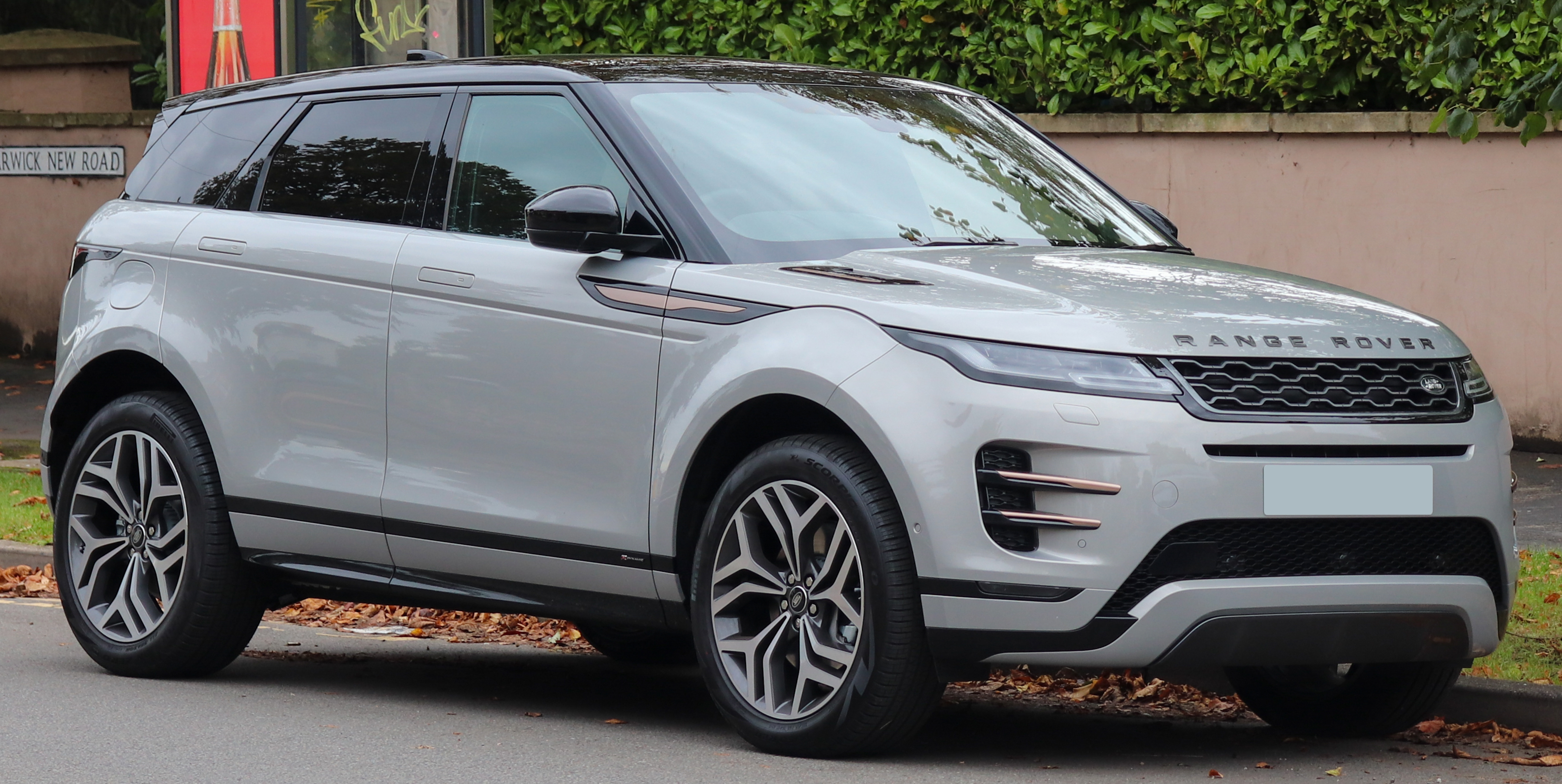

Overview
- Model code: L551
- Production: 2018–present; 2021–2026 (China)
- Model years: 2019–present
- Assembly: United Kingdom: Halewood (Jaguar Land Rover Halewood); China: Changshu (Chery Jaguar Land Rover); India: Pune (JLR India); Brazil: Itatiaia (JLR Brazil)
- Designer: Gerry McGovern; Phil Simmons

Body and chassis
- Body style: 5-door SUV
- Platform: JLR PTA
- Related: Land Rover Discovery Sport; Jaguar E-Pace

Powertrain
- Engine: Petrol: 1.5 L AJ150 turbo I3 (P160); 2.0 L AJ20P SC I4; 2.0 L AJ20P MHEV I4 (P200, P250, P300); Petrol PHEV: 1.5 L AJ150 PHEV I3 + electric (P300e); Diesel: 2.0 L AJ20D I4 (D150); 2.0 L AJ20D MHEV turbo I4 (D150, D180); 2.0 L AJ20D MHEV twin-turbo I4 (D240)
- Electric motor: 48V mild-hybrid (Synchronous Reluctance Motor); 80 kW Synchronous Reluctance Motor (PHEV)
- Transmission: 6-speed manual; 8-Speed Aisin automatic (P160 & P300e); 9-speed ZF 9-HP automatic
- Battery: 15 kWh Lithium ion (PHEV)

Dimensions
- Wheelbase: 2,681 mm (105.6 in); 2,841 mm (111.9 in) (long-wheelbase)
- Length: 4,371 mm (172.1 in); 4,531 mm (178.4 in) (long-wheelbase)
- Width: 1,904 mm (75.0 in)
- Height: 1,649 mm (64.9 in)
- Kerb weight: 1,787–1,955 kg (3,940–4,310 lb); 2,005–2,010 kg (4,420–4,431 lb) (long-wheelbase)

The second generation Evoque was revealed at an event in London on 22 November 2018.

Engines at launch are diesels in 150 bhp FWD and 180 and 240 bhp AWD, and AWD petrols in 200, 250 and 300 bhp. The second-generation Evoque adopts Land Rover's new design language that was launched with the Velar in 2017. This includes retracting door handles, smoother surfacing, and a new infotainment system with a second touchscreen with integrated knobs for climate settings. In some countries, the Evoque is also available with 1.5t 3 cylinder non-PHEV engine called "P160".

The Evoque P300e plug-in hybrid model is a combination of a 1.5-litre 3-cylinder turbocharged Ingenium petrol engine and an electric motor on the rear axle, with a system output of 227 kW (304 hp; 309 PS) and 55.06 kg⋅m (540 N⋅m; 398 lbf⋅ft) of torque. The 15 kWh lithium-ion battery pack is claimed to deliver an all-electric range of up to 66 km (41 mi).

A China-exclusive long-wheelbase version was revealed at an event in Shanghai on 15 June 2021. On 31 March 2026, the last Range Rover Evoque came off the production line in China, as Jaguar Land Rover is instead focusing on electric vehicles for that market.

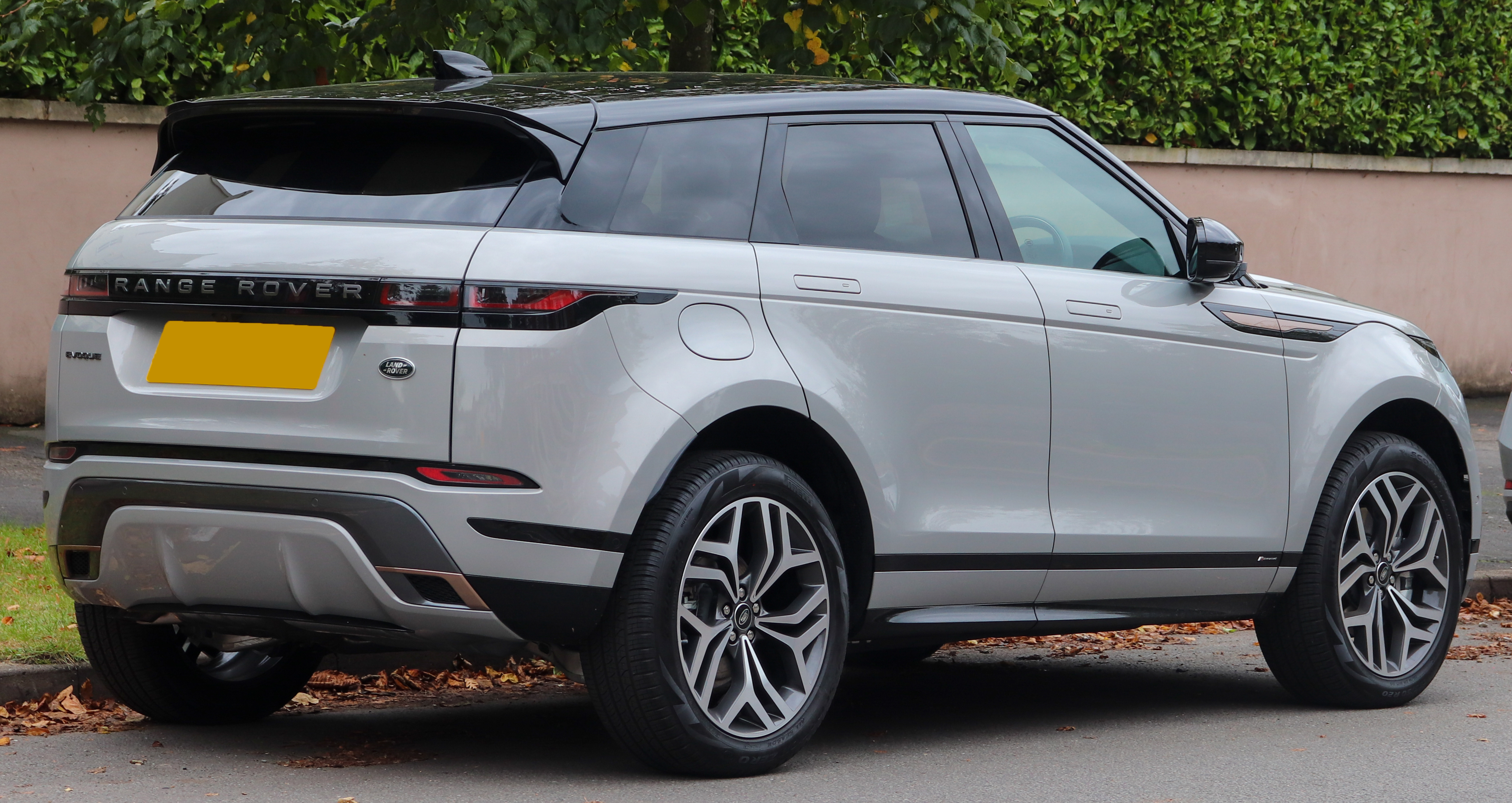
Rear view

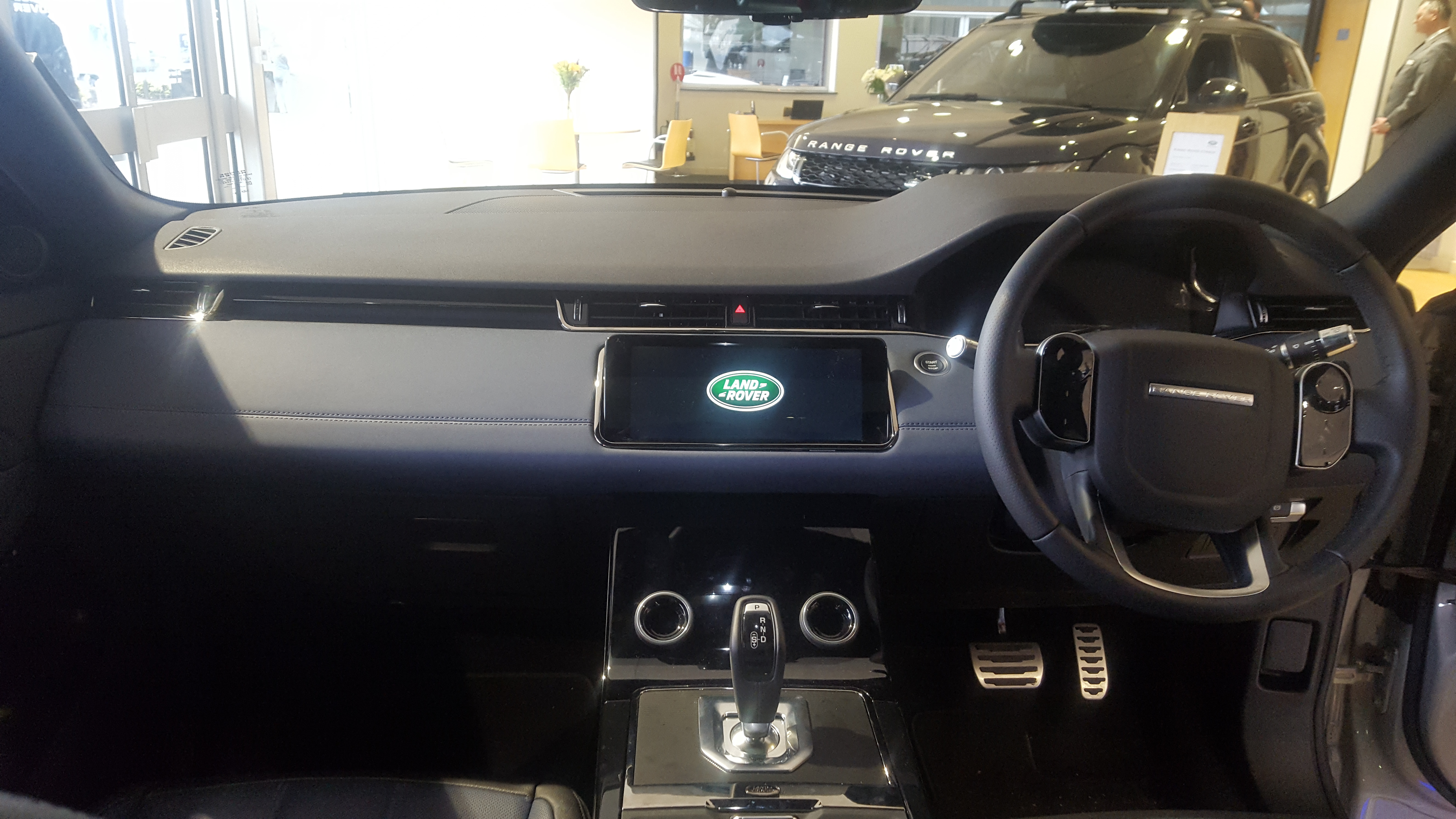
Interior

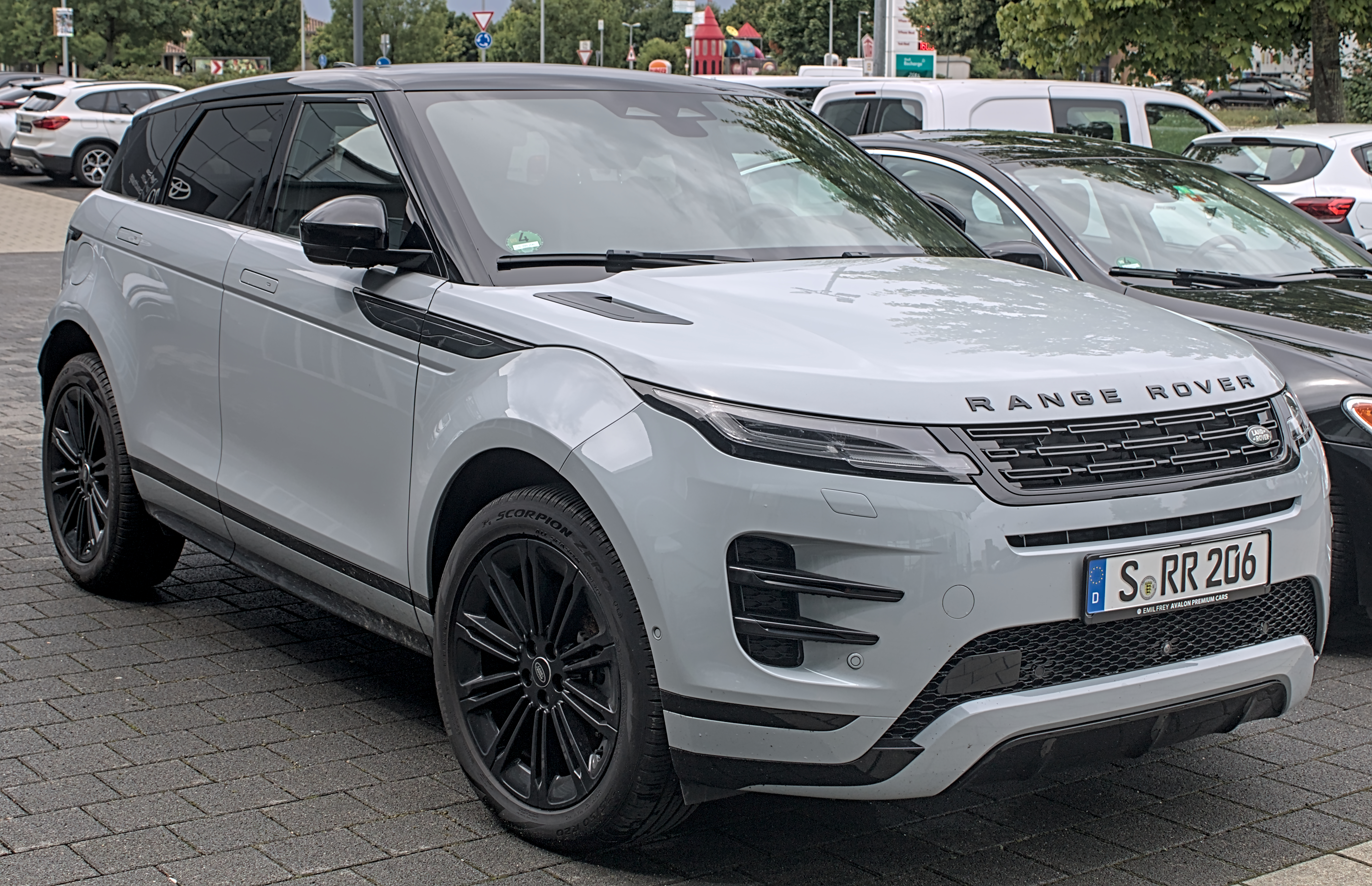
2023 facelift

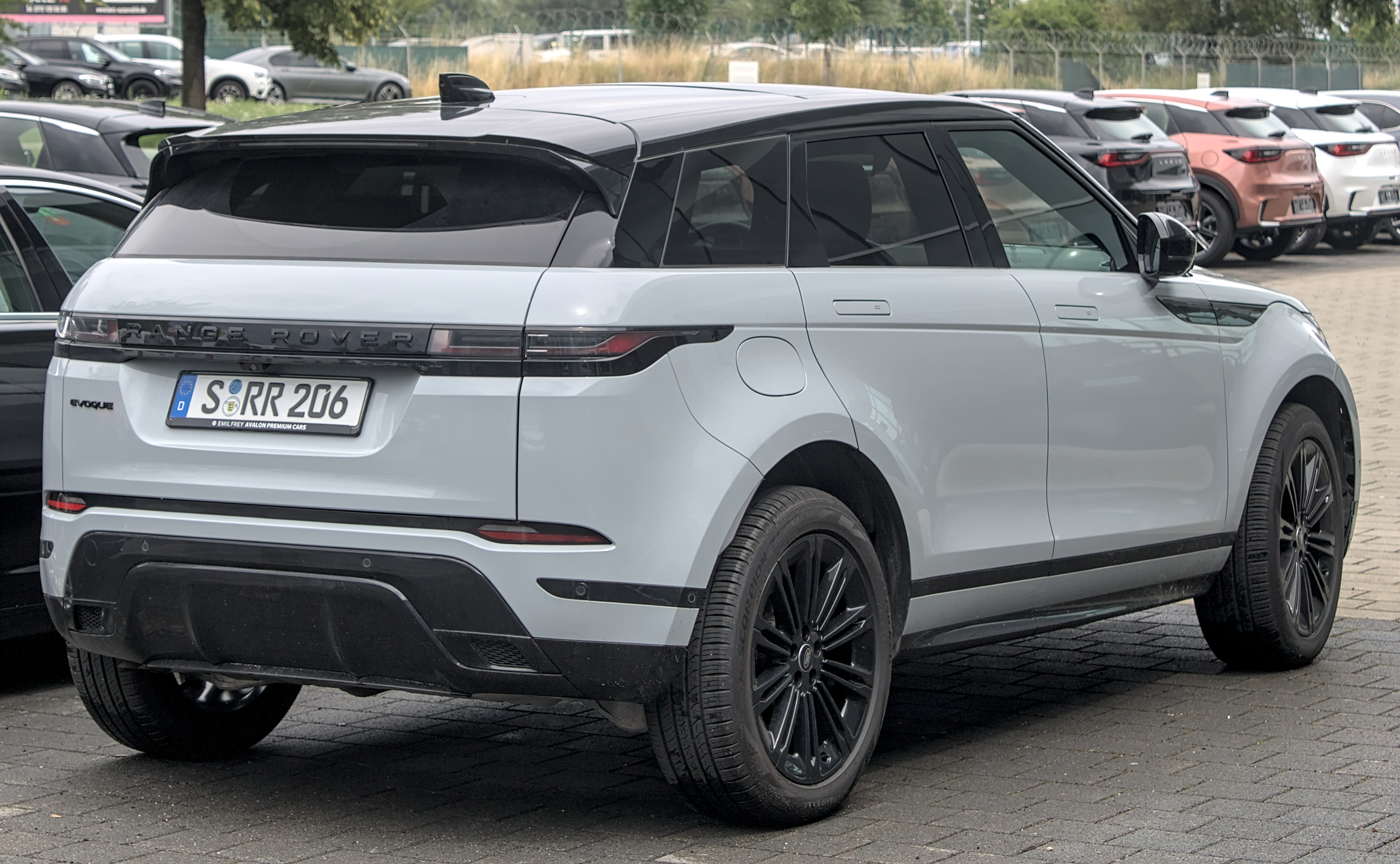
Rear view

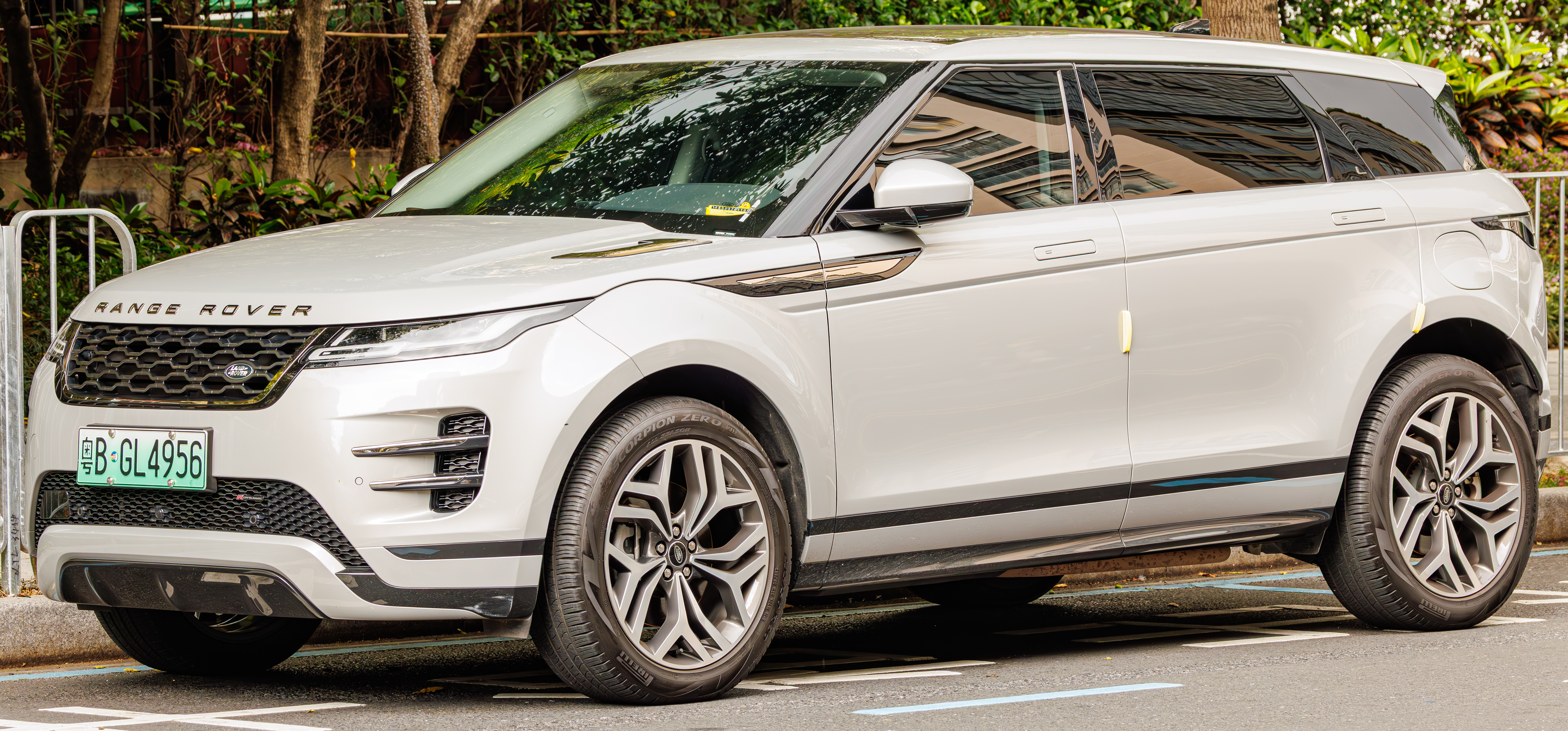
Long-wheelbase

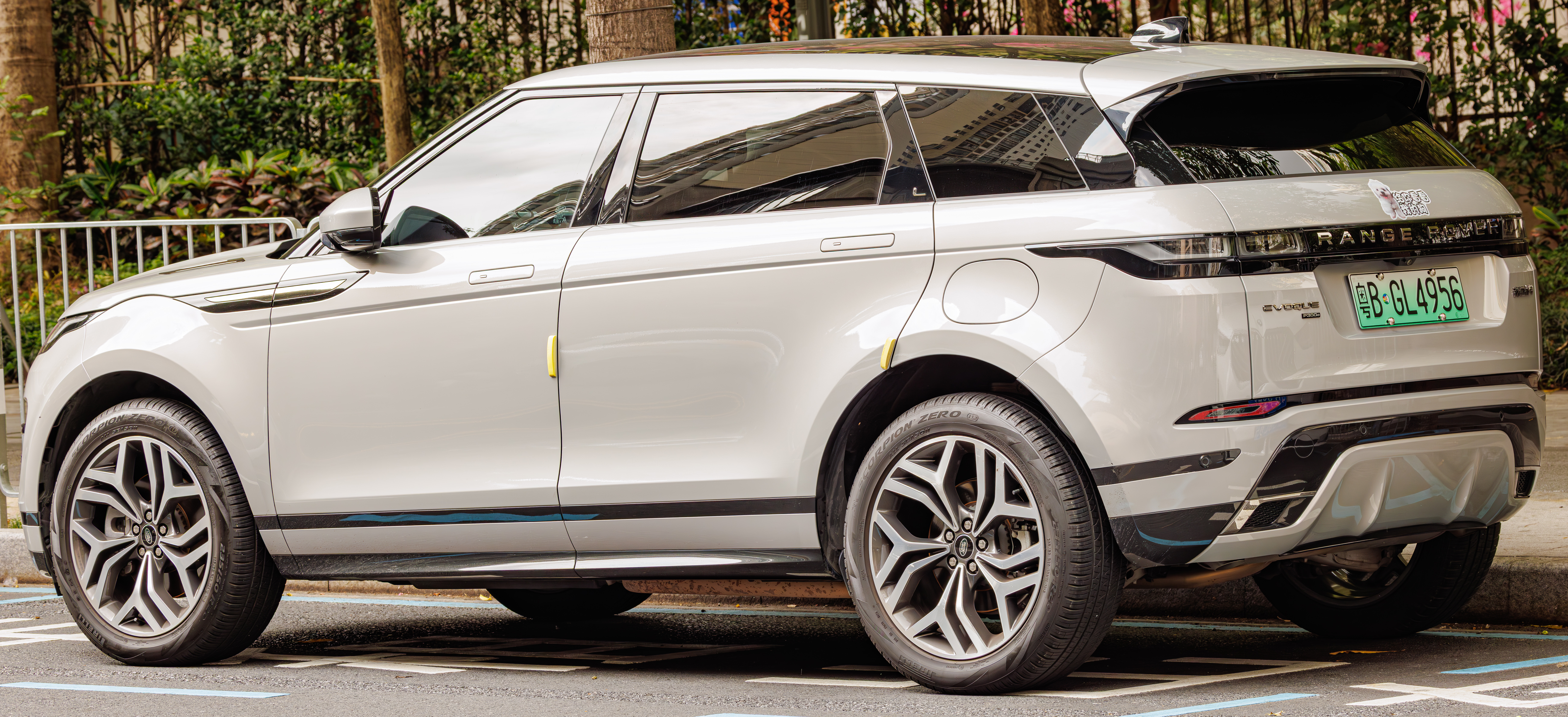
Rear view

=== Safety ===
ANCAP test results* Land Rover Ranger Rover Evoque all variants (2019, aligned with Euro NCAP)
| Test | Points | % |
|---|---|---|
| Overall: | 5 /5 stars | |
| Adult occupant: | 35.9 | 94% |
| Child occupant: | 43.7 | 89% |
| Pedestrian: | 34.7 | 72% |
| Safety assist: | 9.2 | 73% |

Euro NCAP test results* Range Rover Evoque R Dynamic 'S' 2.0 diesel (LHD) (2019)
| Test | Points | % |
|---|---|---|
| Overall: | 5 /5 stars | |
| Adult occupant: | 36 | 94% |
| Child occupant: | 42.7 | 87% |
| Pedestrian: | 34.8 | 72% |
| Safety assist: | 9.5 | 73% |

== Worldwide sales ==
2011 represented only a partial year of sales as it was released later in the year, amounting to 10% of total Land Rover sales worldwide. For 2012 and 2013, the Evoque achieved nearly 36% of total Land Rover sales.

| Year | Sales |
|---|---|
| 2011 | 22,710 |
| 2012 | 108,598 |
| 2013 | 124,292 |
| 2014 | 125,364 |
| 2015 | 108,620 |
| 2016 | 112,461 |
| 2017 | 114,373 |
| 2018 | 98,501 |
| 2019 | 68,200 |
| Total | 883,119 |
