= Hill descent control system =

Driver-assistance system

Hill descent control (HDC, or hill mode descent control) is a driver-assistance system allowing for a controlled hill descent in rough terrain without any brake input from the driver.

== Overview ==
A vehicle can perform controlled descent using the anti-lock braking system (ABS) and in some cases engine braking. If a vehicle accelerates under the force of gravity, the system will automatically apply brakes to slow down to the desired vehicle speed. Cruise control buttons can adjust the speed on some vehicles. Applying pressure to the accelerator or brake pedal will override the HDC system. Later implementations combine HDC with traction control and low-range gears and have reduced the set speed to slower than walking pace for extra control.

== History ==
Land Rover invented HDC in late 2002 by adding it to the now discontinued Freelander.
