= CCSTV New Year's Gala =

Chinese annual New Year's Gala television program

CCSTV New Year's Gala (simplified Chinese: 中国山寨电视台春节联欢晚会; traditional Chinese: 中國山寨電視台春節聯歡晚會; pinyin: Zhōngguó Shānzhài Diànshìtái Chūnjié Liánhuān Wǎnhuì) is a low-budget, three-hour New Year's Gala program organized by Shi Mengqi (施孟奇) of China Country Side TV (simplified Chinese: 山寨电视台; traditional Chinese: 山寨電視台; pinyin: Shānzhài Diànshìtái; CCSTV). It is the grassroots shanzhai version of the official CCTV New Year's Gala.

== Organization ==
CCSTV and its New Year's Gala is organized by Beijing-based cameraman Shi Mengqi. In an interview with Beijing Today, Shi criticized the CCTV New Year's Gala, saying that he had attended the CCTV New Year's Gala one year, but that it is "not designed for the ordinary viewer [...] The audience was nothing but high officials and rich people.

Since the announcement of CCSTV, 10 volunteers have joined Shi to organize the program, assisting with items such as programming, auditing, and soliciting sponsors. 700 groups and individuals have sent Shi applicants to be considered for the three-hour program, and over 30 segments were scheduled for the program by the end of December 2008. Amongst the performers scheduled are the "Bike King of the East" Zhou Changchun (周长春), who will perform bicycle tricks.

== Social response ==
National satellite station Guizhou TV initially offered venues and support for the CCSTV New Year's Gala, stating that they "just want to provide an alternative for people who cannot go home during Spring Festival." However, CCSTV decided to part with Guizhou TV, though there is a possibility for performers from the program to work with Guizhou TV after the Gala, and some parts of the Gala may be later broadcast on Guizhou TV.

An online survey conducted by the popular Chinese forum Tianya found that over half of the 12,350 polled were tired of the CCTV New Year's Gala, and that 73% were looking forward to watch the shanzhai version.

== See also ==
- Shanzhai
- CCTV New Year's Gala
- Subcultures
- Kuso

== Internet video ==
- In Chinese:大中華的“山寨”情結來自何方？
