= Discovery 2 =

Discovery 2 may refer to:

- Land Rover Discovery 2, a second-generation Discovery SUV car model by Land Rover.
- Mars Pathfinder, the second mission of the Discovery Program.
