= Horse & Hound =

British magazine

- Cover of 6 June 2024, 140th anniversary special issue
- Editor In Chief: Sarah Jenkins
- Categories: Equine
- Frequency: Weekly
- Circulation: 44,458 (ABC Jan - Dec 2013); Print and digital editions.
- First issue: 1884
- Company: Future plc
- Country: United Kingdom
- Language: English
- Website: horseandhound.co.uk
- ISSN: 0018-5140

Horse & Hound is the oldest equestrian weekly magazine of the United Kingdom. Its first edition was published in 1884. The magazine contains horse industry news, reports from equestrian events, veterinary advice about caring for horses, and horses for sale. Fox hunting has always been an important topic for the magazine, as are the sports of eventing, dressage, show jumping, horse racing, showing, carriage driving and endurance riding. The magazine includes commentaries from top riders and trainers including event rider William Fox-Pitt, top eventing trainer Captain Mark Phillips, top show jumper William Funnell and Olympic dressage rider and trainer Carl Hester, among others.

Among the major annual equestrian events reported by Horse & Hound are Badminton Horse Trials, Burghley Horse Trials, The Horse of the Year Show and the Olympia London International Horse Show.

The magazine is published by Future plc. The latest copy reaches shops every Thursday, while press day is Monday.

== Sister publications ==
Horse & Hound is one of a number of specialist publications produced by Future Publishing.

In the past Horse & Hound had two sister equestrian publications, Eventing magazine and HORSE magazine. Eventing was incorporated into Horse & Hound in 2015 and HORSE was sold to MyTimeMedia in spring 2013.

== Horse & Hound online ==
Horse & Hound's online edition is updated daily with equestrian news and reports from horse events. The site includes a forum where horse enthusiasts can share their experiences with others and ask for help with horse related problems. The website also publishes details of major horse events, biographies of riders, offers training and buying advice, as well as picture galleries.

== In popular culture ==
Horse & Hound was shown and mentioned in the 1999 film Notting Hill. Hugh Grant's character claims to be a journalist from the magazine at a press junket, and later at a news conference.

In the 1995 film Circle of Friends, Celia Westward is shown reading Horse & Hound.

In the 2020 film “Dream Horse”, Jan Vokes, played by Toni Collette, looks at Equestrian magazines before picking up a copy of “Horse & Hound” and browsing its contents, before an advert for Directory of The Turf catches her eye with “Everything you need to know about Thoroughbred Racing & Breeding in 1 book.” She subsequently tears out the advert.

In the CW series, Sherlock & Daughter, as Sherlock Holmes is shown using his newly installed telephone to call various telephone numbers to ascertain the name of the owners, he pretends to be a salesman of Horse & Hound, asking a doctor at the Green and Crest Asylum for the Criminally Insane if he would like to subscribe to the magazine for visitors in the waiting room.
