= Eventing (magazine) =

Monthly magazine published by IPC Media

- Editor: Julie Harding
- Categories: Eventing
- Frequency: Monthly
- Circulation: 12,000
- Publisher: IPC Media
- Founded: 1985
- Final issue: June 2015
- Country: United Kingdom
- Language: English
- Website: Eventing magazine

Eventing was a monthly eventing magazine published by IPC Media.

== History and profile ==
When it launched in 1985, The Guardian described Eventing as "a tough workhorse aimed at the serious trials riders and budding Lucinda Greens." The magazine was edited by Julie Harding. The magazine ceased publication in June 2015.
