= Tota =

Tota may refer to:

== People ==
=== Given name ===
- Tota (bishop) (died between 786 and 789), Bishop of Selsey (in what is now England)
- Toda of Pamplona (died 958) (Basque: Tota Aznar), queen consort of Pamplona
- Tota of Ribagorza (died 1019), suo jure Countess of Ribagorza and Countess of Pallars by marriage
- Tota Roy Chowdhury (born 1976), Indian Bengali actor
- Tōta Kaneko (1919–2018), Japanese writer
- Tota Singh (1941–2022), Indian politician

=== Surname ===
- André Tota (born 1950), French former footballer
- Josephine Tota (1910–1996), Italian-born American painter
- Matthieu Tota (born 1985), commonly known as M. Pokora, French singer and songwriter
- Mohlominyane Tota, Lesothan 21st century politician
- Vincenzo Tota (born 1963), Italian medical doctor specializing in sports medicine

=== Nickname ===
- Tota, a nickname of Ana Vitória Magalhães (born 2000), Brazilian cyclist
- Tota, a nickname of Antonio Carbajal (1929–2023), Mexican football goalkeeper
- Tota, a nickname of Diego Lugano (born 1980), Uruguayan footballer
- Teodora Tota Venkova (1855–1921), Bulgarian teacher and physician, considered the first native Bulgarian woman doctor
- Gabriel Tota, Brazilian footballer Gabriel Ferreira Neris (born 2001)

=== Other people ===
- Tota Shakur, original stage name of LaRussell Dwayne Thomas (born 1994), American rapper
- A clan of the Bharwad people of India

== Places ==
- Tota, Benin, an arrondissement
- Tota, Boyacá, Colombia, a town and municipality
- Lake Tota, the largest lake in Colombia
- Tota, a Logba people settlement in Ghana

== Other uses ==
- Tota (moth), a moth of the family Pyralidae
- Tales of the Abyss, a 2005 role-playing video game
- Tōta Konoe, protagonist of the manga series UQ Holder!
- Tota Matsuda, a supporting character in the manga series Death Note
