= Land Rover Freelander =

Compact SUV by Land Rover, 1997–2015

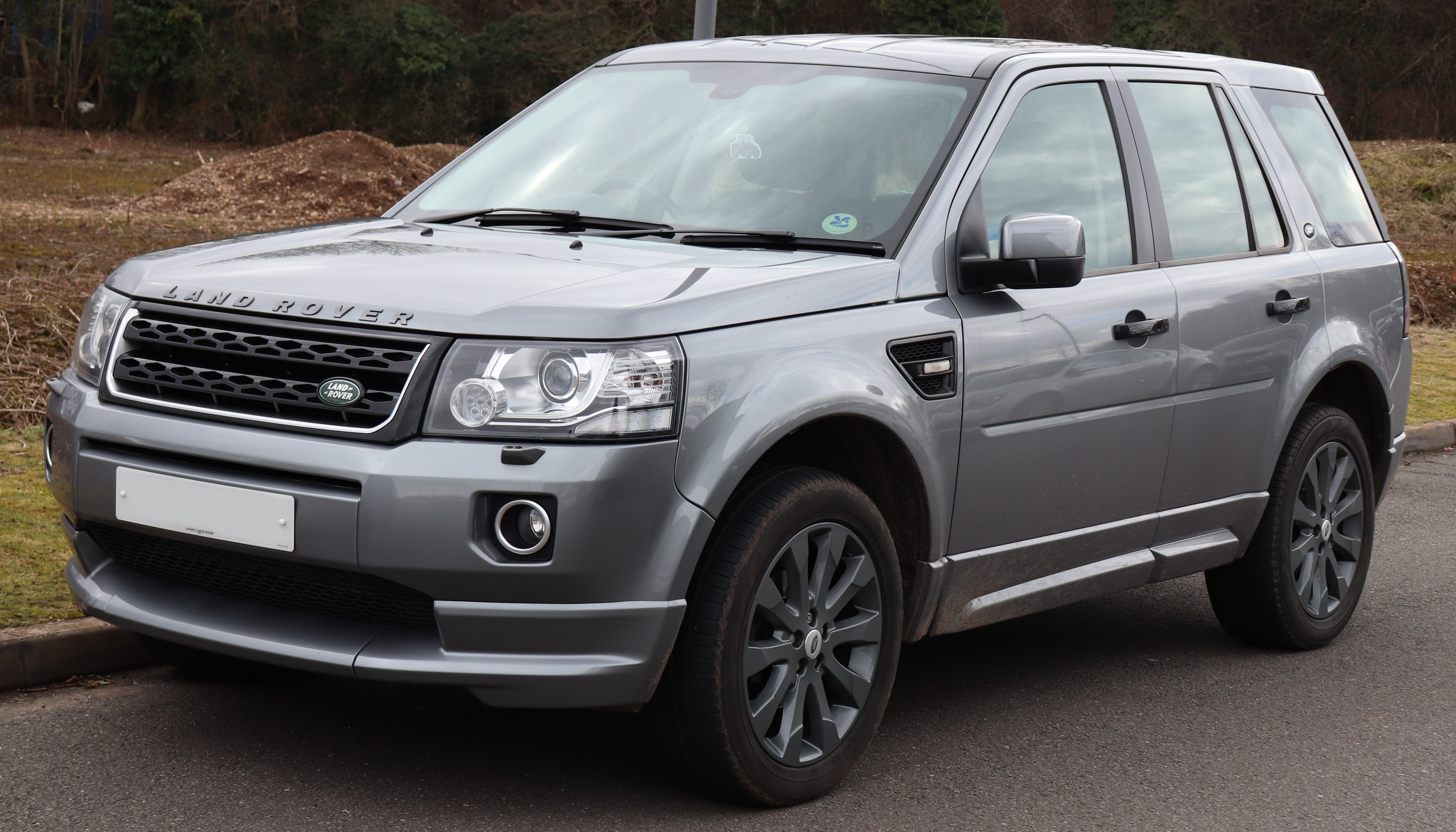
- 2013 Land Rover Freelander 2 Dynamic SD4 (UK)

Overview
- Manufacturer: Land Rover
- Production: October 1997 – October 2014
- Model years: 1998–2015

Body and chassis
- Class: Compact crossover SUV
- Layout: Transverse front-engine, four-wheel-drive Transverse front-engine, front-wheel-drive (eD4, 2010–2014)
- Chassis: Unibody

Chronology
- Successor: Land Rover Discovery Sport

The Land Rover Freelander is a series of four-wheel-drive vehicles (some models being front-wheel-drive) that was manufactured and marketed by Land Rover from 1997 to 2015. The second generation was sold from 2007 to 2015 in North America and the Middle East as the LR2 and in Europe as the Freelander 2. The Freelander was sold in both two-wheel and four-wheel drive versions. The name 'Freelander' is derived from the combination of 'Freedom' and 'Lander'.

After having built exclusively body-on-frame 4WD vehicles for half a century, the first generation Freelander was the brand's first model to use monocoque (unibody) structures, and was offered in three- and five-door body options, including a semi soft-top. The second generation (2007–2015) dropped all two-door options, leaving only a five-door estate car-like body, and – after 62 years – became the brand's first ever to offer a two-wheel drive option (as of 2010).

After a five-year hiatus, the two-door Freelanders were succeeded by the three-door versions of the Range Rover Evoque in 2011, and the five-door generation 2 was replaced by the Discovery Sport in 2015, the nameplate spanning two generations and less than eighteen years.

== First generation (L314; 1997–2006) ==
First generation
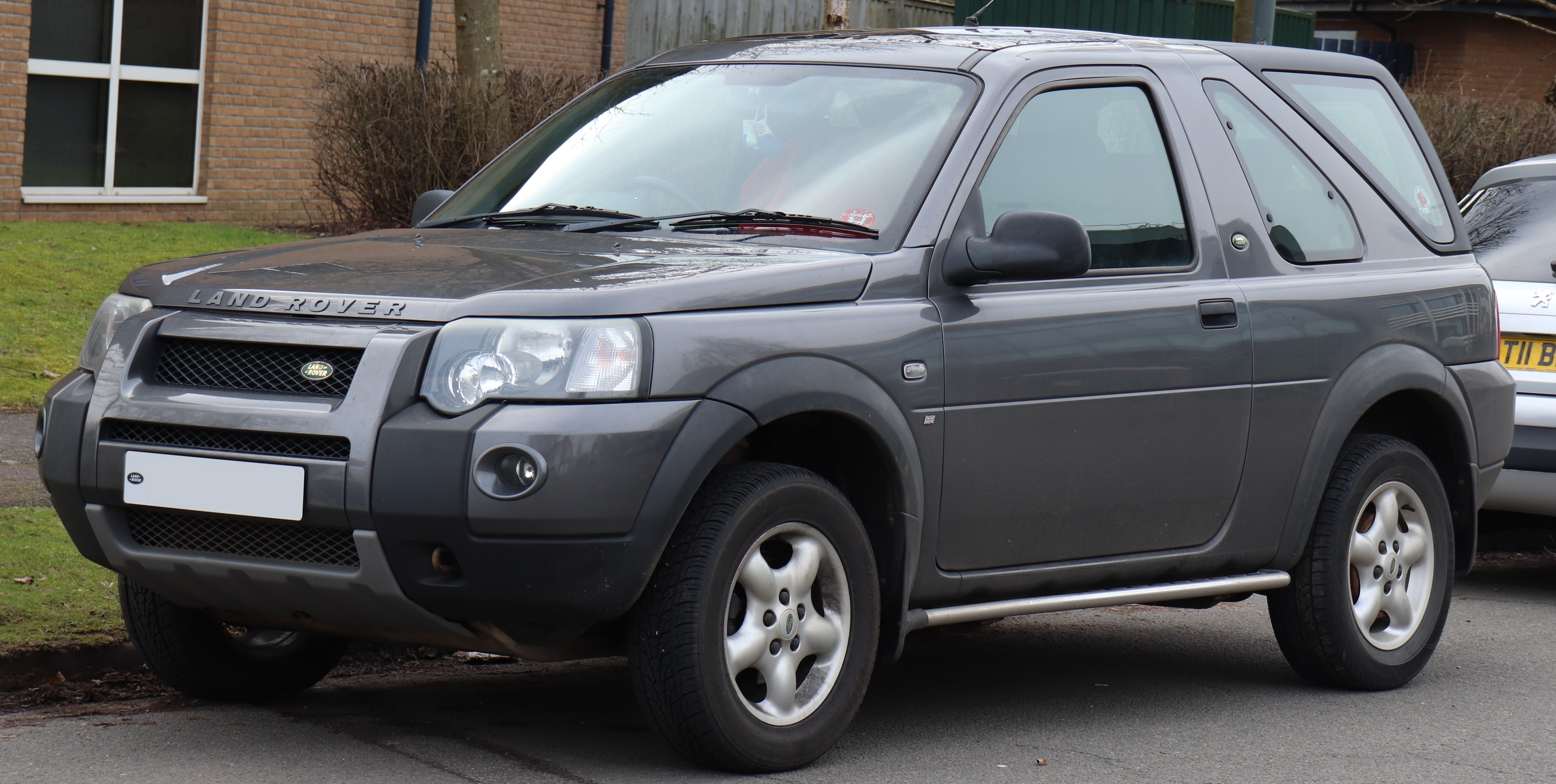
- Facelift Freelander Sport 3-door

Overview
- Model code: L314
- Production: October 1997 – November 2006
- Model years: 1998–2006
- Assembly: United Kingdom: Solihull (Solihull plant); Thailand: Rayong (Thai Swedish Assembly); Malaysia: Shah Alam; South Africa: Silverton (Ford Motor Company of Southern Africa)
- Designer: Gerry McGovern (1992)

Body and chassis
- Body style: 5-door SUV; 3-door convertible SUV

Powertrain
- Engine: Petrol: 1.8 L Rover 18K4F I4; 2.5 L Rover KV6 V6; Diesel: 2.0 L Rover 20T2I I4; 2.0 L BMW M47R I4
- Transmission: manual 5-speed GETRAG 283 automatic 5-speed JATCO JF506E

Dimensions
- Wheelbase: 101.0 in (2,565 mm)
- Length: 2001–2003 5-door: 175.0 in (4,445 mm); 2004–2006 5-door: 174.1 in (4,422 mm); 3-door: 175.1 in (4,448 mm)
- Width: 2001–2003: 71.1 in (1,806 mm); 2004–2006: 71.2 in (1,808 mm)
- Height: 2001–2003 5-door: 68.9 in (1,750 mm); 2004–2006 5-door: 69.0 in (1,753 mm); 3-door: 67.2 in (1,707 mm)

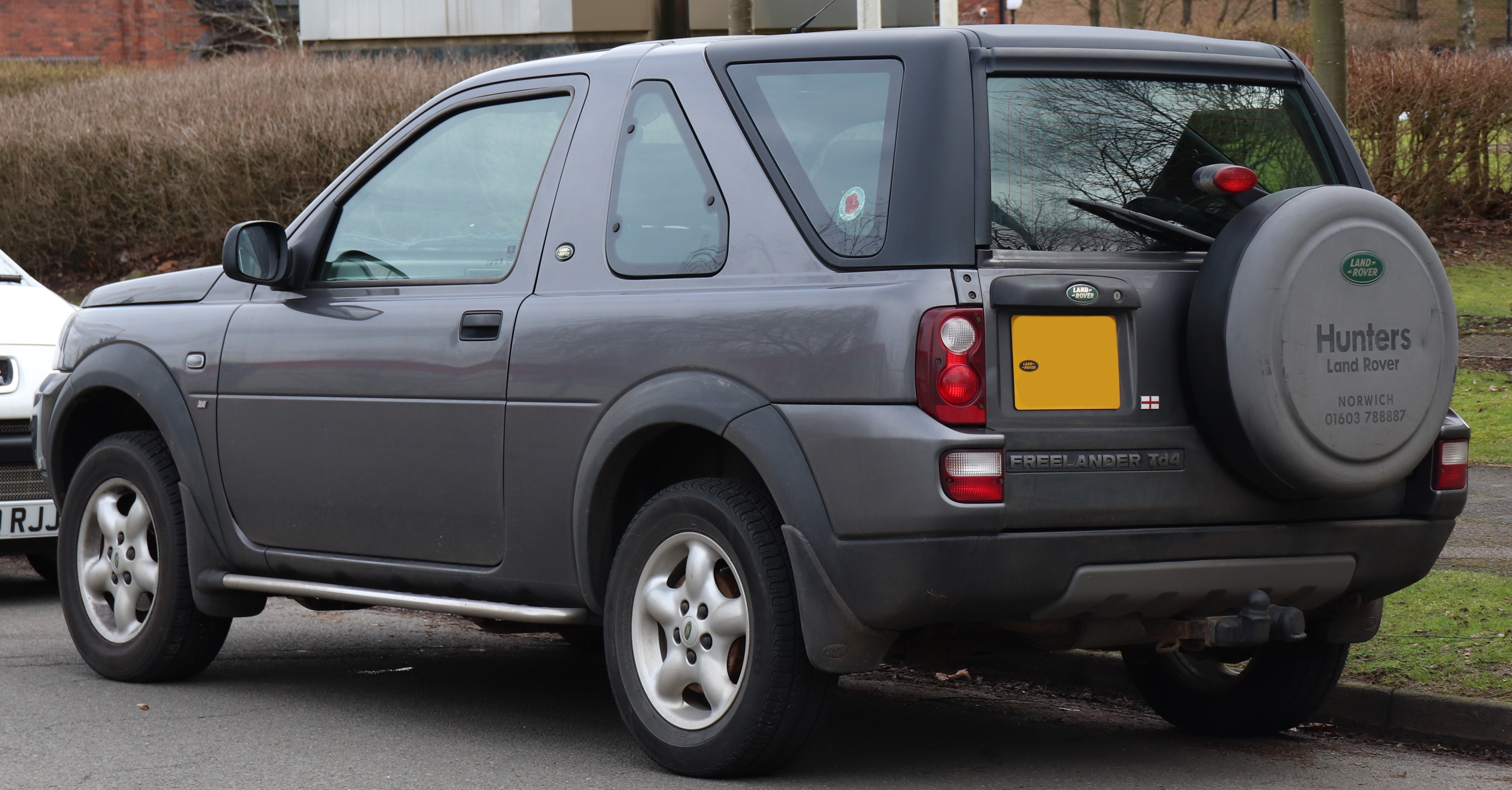
Facelift Land Rover Freelander 3-door

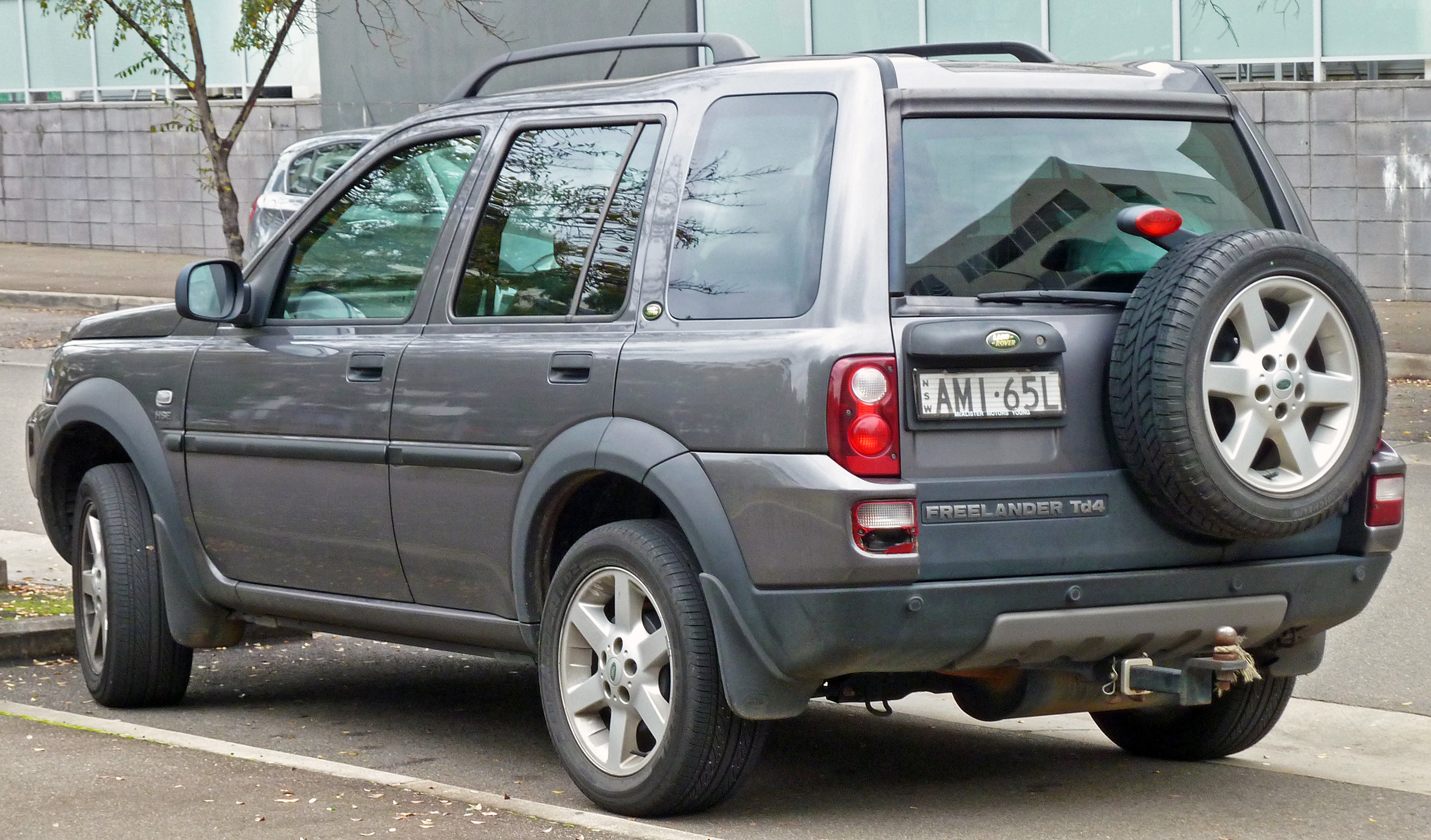
Facelift Land Rover Freelander 5-door

=== Development ===
In 1988, British Aerospace acquired the Rover Group for £150 million, which allowed resources across Rover brands and Land Rover to be pooled differently, and the idea of developing a smaller Land Rover became more attainable than previously.

When the board approved the Pathfinder project, it was codenamed CB40 (after Canley Building 40, where the concept was initially developed). Remarkably, the new, compact Land Rover had become almost as long as the original Range Rover, that had been phased out just the year before, and even sported an inch (2.5 cm) longer wheelbase. While being Land Rover's first monocoque design, it still featured a substantial subframe with welded, box section rails, giving it extra strength and rigidity.

=== Production ===
The original plan had been to contract manufacture the car, and an agreement with Valmet in Finland had already been made, but when BMW acquired Rover Group, they terminated the agreement, and instead funded production facilities at Solihull, making use of the Rover SD1 assembly hall which had been inactive since the early 1980s, when Rover car production was moved to Cowley.

In 2002, Land Rover SA was awarded export contracts to supply 1,000 left-hand drive Defenders to Angola and more than 3,000 right-hand drive Freelanders and Defenders to Australia. This followed the move by the manufacturer to build Freelanders for local distribution at the Ford Motor Company of Southern Africa's Q1, ISO 9001, and ISO 14001 certified assembly plant in Silverton, Pretoria. Paul Melhuish, then Land Rover SA’s sales and marketing director, said: " “From November this year we will commence shipment of approximately 3,000 Freelanders and 216 Defenders to Australia. The Freelander shipments will comprise both TD4 and KV6 models, while the Defender 110 CSW and the Defender 130 double cab models will make up the majority of the Defender sales figures."

=== Popularity ===
The Mk1 Land Rover Freelander was an instant hit and went on to become the biggest-selling four-wheel-drive model in Europe, with over 540,000 units sold over its nine-year lifespan. The Freelander became Europe's best-selling 4WD vehicle for five consecutive years after launch in 1997; and in 2016 Land Rover embraced it as its 8th 'Heritage vehicle'.

=== Model variations ===
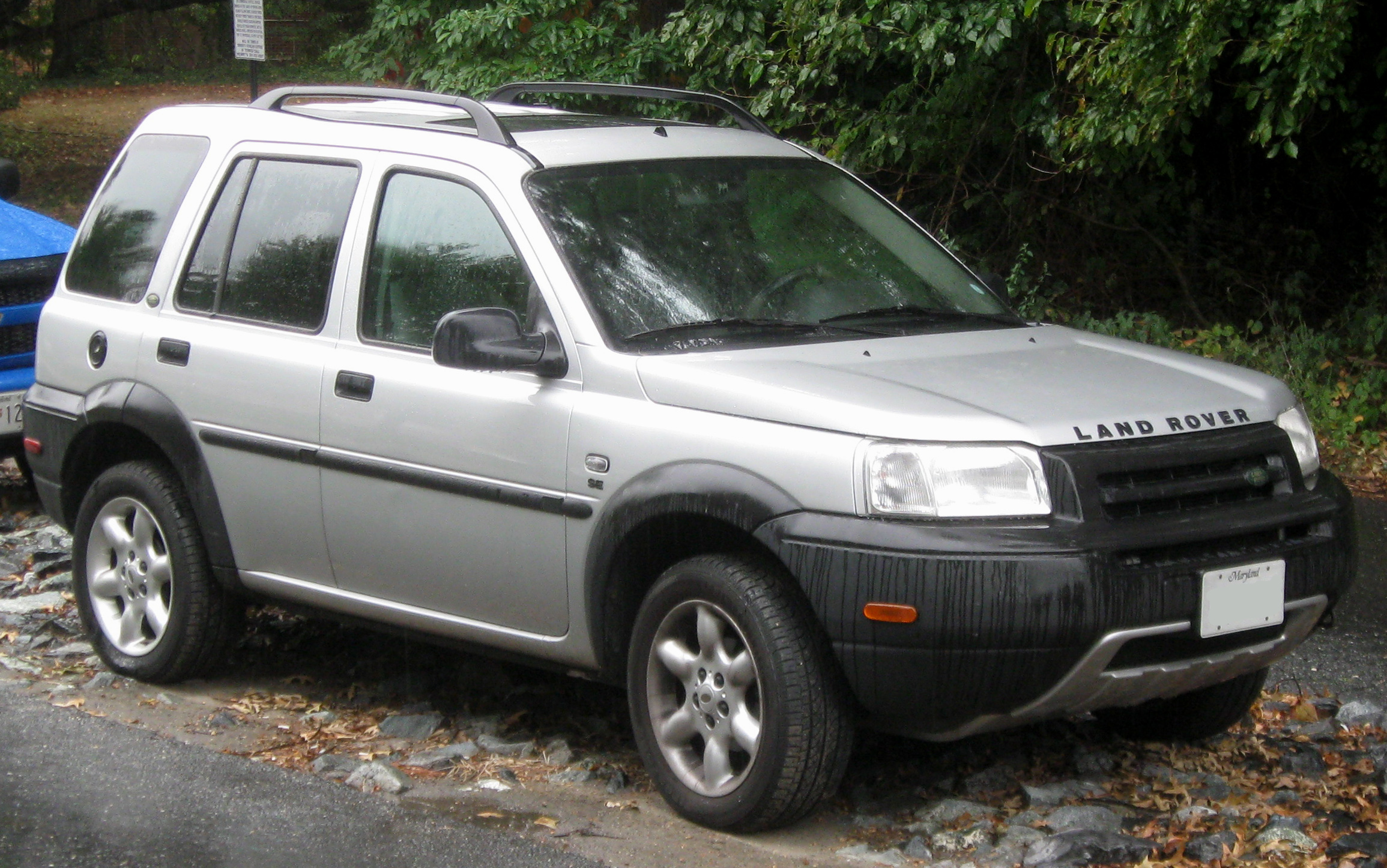
Pre–facelift Land Rover Freelander SE 5-door (US model)

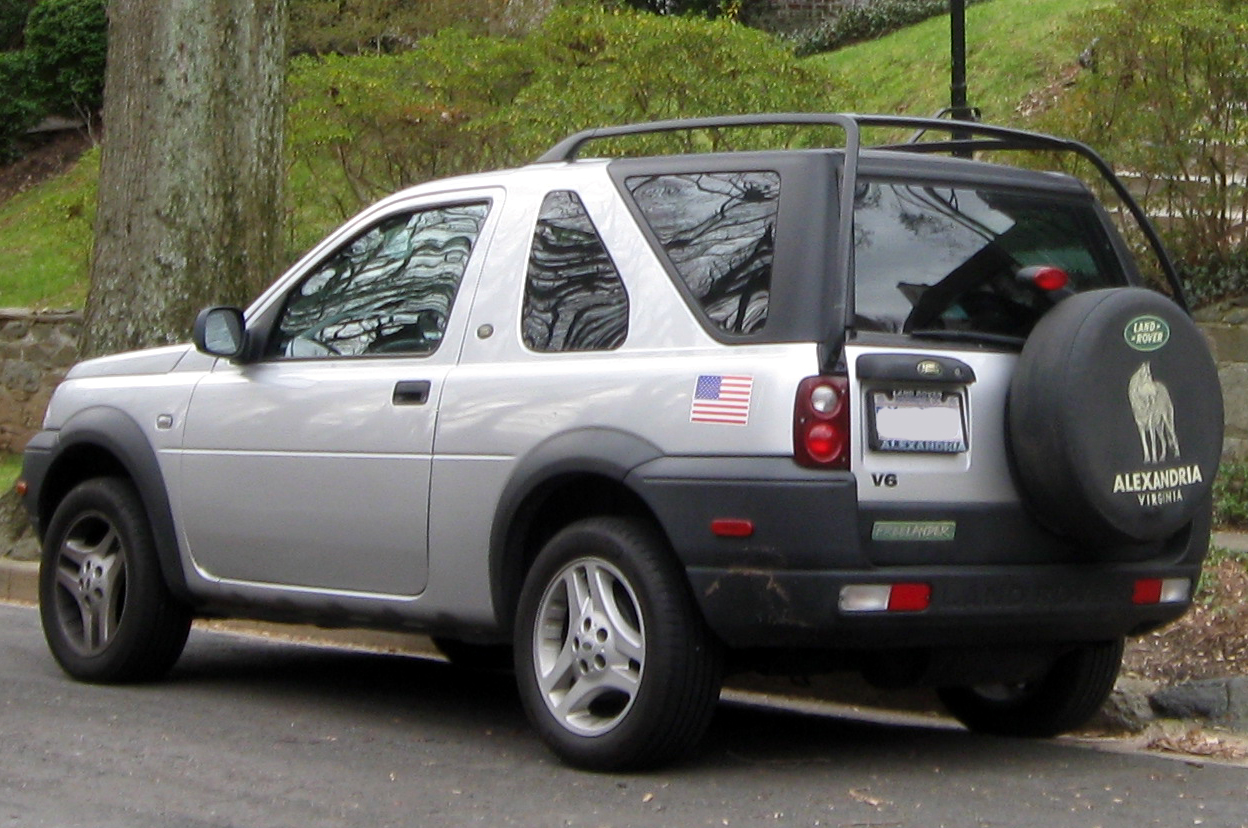
Pre–facelift Land Rover Freelander SE3 (US model)

There were a variety of models, based around five-door estate and three-door softback (semi-convertible), hardback, and commercial (van-like) versions. In 2004, Land Rover introduced an improved and upgraded version of the Mark I; changes included a new interior and major external revisions, including a new face and rear.

The three-door model was available in E, S, ES, Sport and Sport Premium trim and the five-door model in available in E, S, ES, HSE, Sport and Sport Premium trim.

=== Freelander in North America ===
The Freelander was launched in the US and Canadian markets in 2001 for the 2002 model year and it was only available with the 2.5L Rover KV6 engine and the 5-speed Jatco JF506E automatic transmission. The five-door model was initially available in S, SE, and HSE trims and the three-door SE3 was introduced in 2003. With a starting price of under $25,000 in the US, it was more than $8,000 cheaper than the Discovery II and was sold as a competitor to off-road SUVs such as the Toyota RAV4, the Honda CR-V, the Jeep Liberty and the Nissan Xterra. Although it initially sold well, the NA-spec Freelander soon encountered several notable reliability issues.

One problem was with the KV6 engine, which had issues with the cast-iron cylinder liners slipping out of place in the engine block, which would damage the engine to the point where it was irreparable. The engine thermostat and coolant expansion tank also failed under warranty, which would cause the engine to overheat, damage the head gaskets and warp the engine block and cylinder heads.

The transmission also had several problems, most often shift solenoid failure in the transmission valve body. Although replacing the solenoids is a relatively inexpensive job, most Land Rover dealers simply replaced the entire transmission. As a result, solenoid failure would happen again and mechanics would often misdiagnose the problem as a failed transmission.

Freelander owners launched a class-action lawsuit, alleging that Land Rover knowingly sold a defective product and that they failed to adhere to the vehicle's warranty coverage during repairs. Land Rover eventually settled with owners by compensating for repairs that the owner paid for out-of-pocket, or they repurchased vehicles under the Lemon law.

Although 15,021 units were sold in 2002, making it the second-best selling Land Rover in the US after the Discovery II, sales plummeted to 6,618 sold in 2003, 5,430 in 2004 and 2,141 in 2005. Today, the Freelander is a rare sight on US roads.

After MG Rover Group went into administration and the Powertrain Ltd division could no longer produce KV6 engines, Land Rover discontinued the Freelander in North America after the 2005 model year. Land Rover left the compact SUV segment until the 2008 model year when the Freelander 2 was launched. It was marketed as the LR2 in order to distance it from the poor reputation brought upon by the Freelander.

=== Engines ===
Engine choices included:

- 1.8-litre I4 Rover K-series petrol (1997–2006), badged as '1.8i', 'Xi' or 'XEi' (Not sold in North America)
- 2.0-litre I4 Rover L-series diesel (1997–2000), badged as 'Di', 'XDi' or 'XEDi'
- 2.0-litre I4 BMW M47 diesel (2001–2006), badged as 'Td4'
- 2.5-litre V6 Rover KV6 Engine petrol (2001–2006), badged as 'V6'

Manual gearboxes dominated the early models, but automatic Tiptronic-style gearboxes (Jatco JF506E) became increasingly popular and were standard on the V6. The Automatic Tiptronic gearbox was also available as an option on the Td4.

=== Marketing ===
The first generation Freelander was marketed as a premium compact 4x4, and used in the 1998 Camel Trophy and participated in Land Rover's G4 Challenge. The vehicle represented a compromise because it did not have a low-range gear selection, nor a locking differential, as found on larger Land Rover models. This meant that in comparison to other Land Rovers, off-road performance was not as good.

It had more than sixteen patented features, including the IRD or Intermediate Reduction Drive, which acted as a front differential and fixed ratio transfer; the VCU or viscous-coupling, which reacts to the differing rotational speed of the prop shafts, allowing varying torque across itself; and the Hill Descent Control system, which was then implemented in the rest of the Land Rover range and even in the first generation BMW X5 (BMW was the parent company of Rover Group at the time of introduction of this model).

This first generation also used a Traction Control system and a special version of ABS produced by Wabco, modified to assist driving in off-road situations. Lack of the MG Rover K18 and KV6 engines after the end of the MG Rover production led Land Rover to discontinue the model on 31 August 2005 in the U.S. and Canada.

=== Safety ===
Euro NCAP test results* Land Rover Freelander GS K1.8-litre petrol (RHD) (2002)
Test	Score	Rating
Adult occupant:	20	3 /5 stars
Pedestrian:	7	1 /4 stars

== Freelander 2 (L359; 2006–2015) ==
Freelander 2
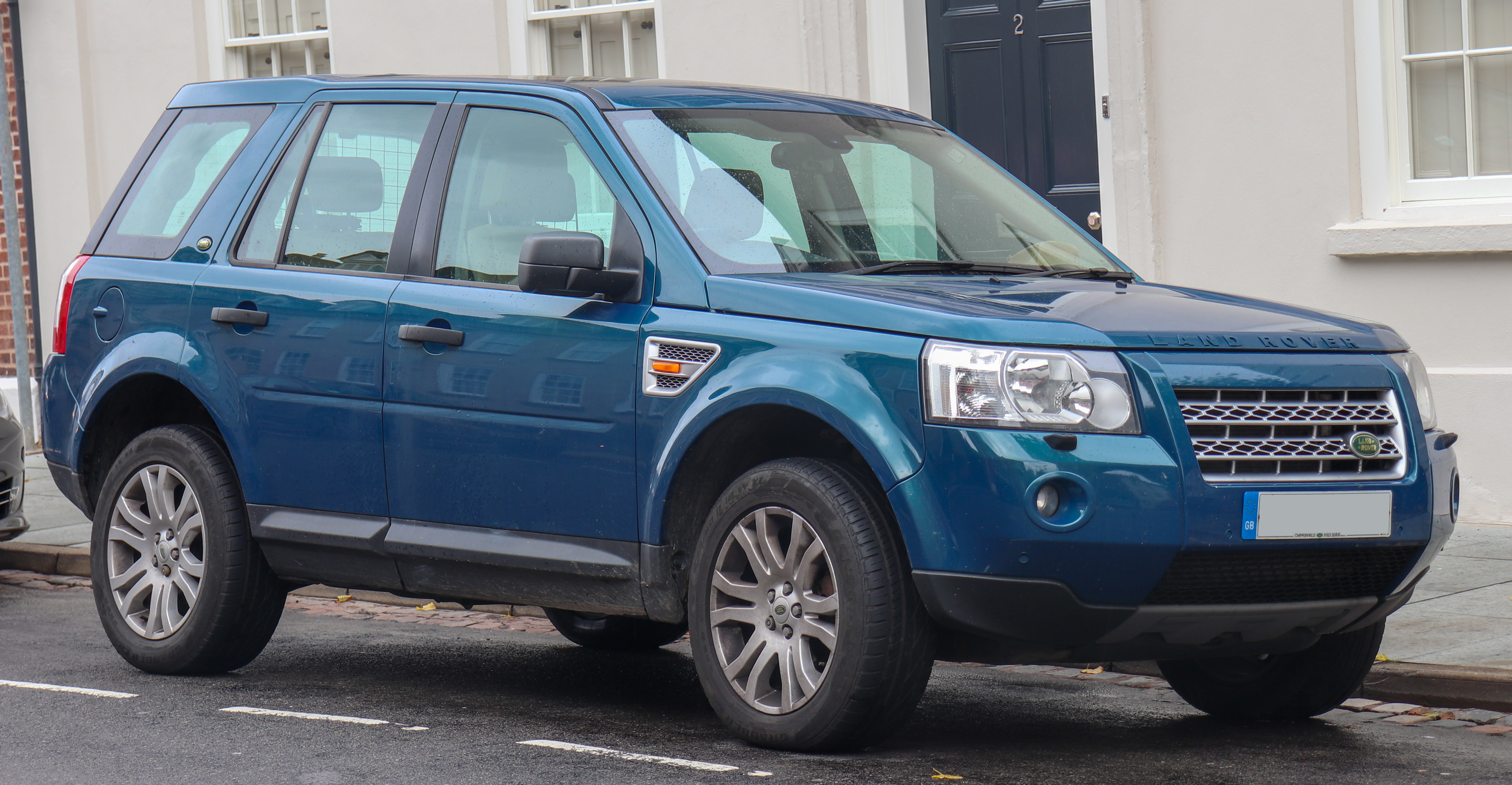
- Pre-facelift Land Rover Freelander 2 HSE TD4

Overview
- Model code: L359
- Also called: Land Rover LR2 (North America & the Middle East)
- Production: December 2006 – October 2014
- Model years: 2007–2015
- Assembly: United Kingdom: Halewood (Halewood Body & Assembly); India: Pune (JLR India); Jordan: Ma'an (Aqaba Assembly Plant)

Body and chassis
- Body style: 5-door SUV
- Platform: Ford EUCD platform
- Related: Volvo XC60; Volvo S80; Ford Mondeo (third generation)

Powertrain
- Engine: Petrol: 2.0 L Ford EcoBoost DI turbo I4; 3.2 L Volvo B6324S5 I6; Diesel: 2.2 L PSA DW12 I4
- Transmission: 6-speed Getrag M66EH50 manual 6-speed Aisin AWF21 automatic

Dimensions
- Wheelbase: 104.7 in (2,659 mm)
- Length: 177.2 in (4,501 mm)
- Width: 75.2 in (1,910 mm)
- Height: 68.5 in (1,740 mm)
- Kerb weight: 3,902–4,300 lb (1,770–1,950 kg)

The second generation was internally designated L359; debuted at the 2006 British International Motor Show and was marketed as the Freelander 2, retaining the Freelander name in Europe and marketed as the LR2 in North America and the Middle East – mirroring the marketing of the new third generation Land Rover Discovery as LR3. A presentation at the Kensington Roof Gardens was held for journalists featuring celebrity tennis player Maria Sharapova. Production ended on 7 October 2014.

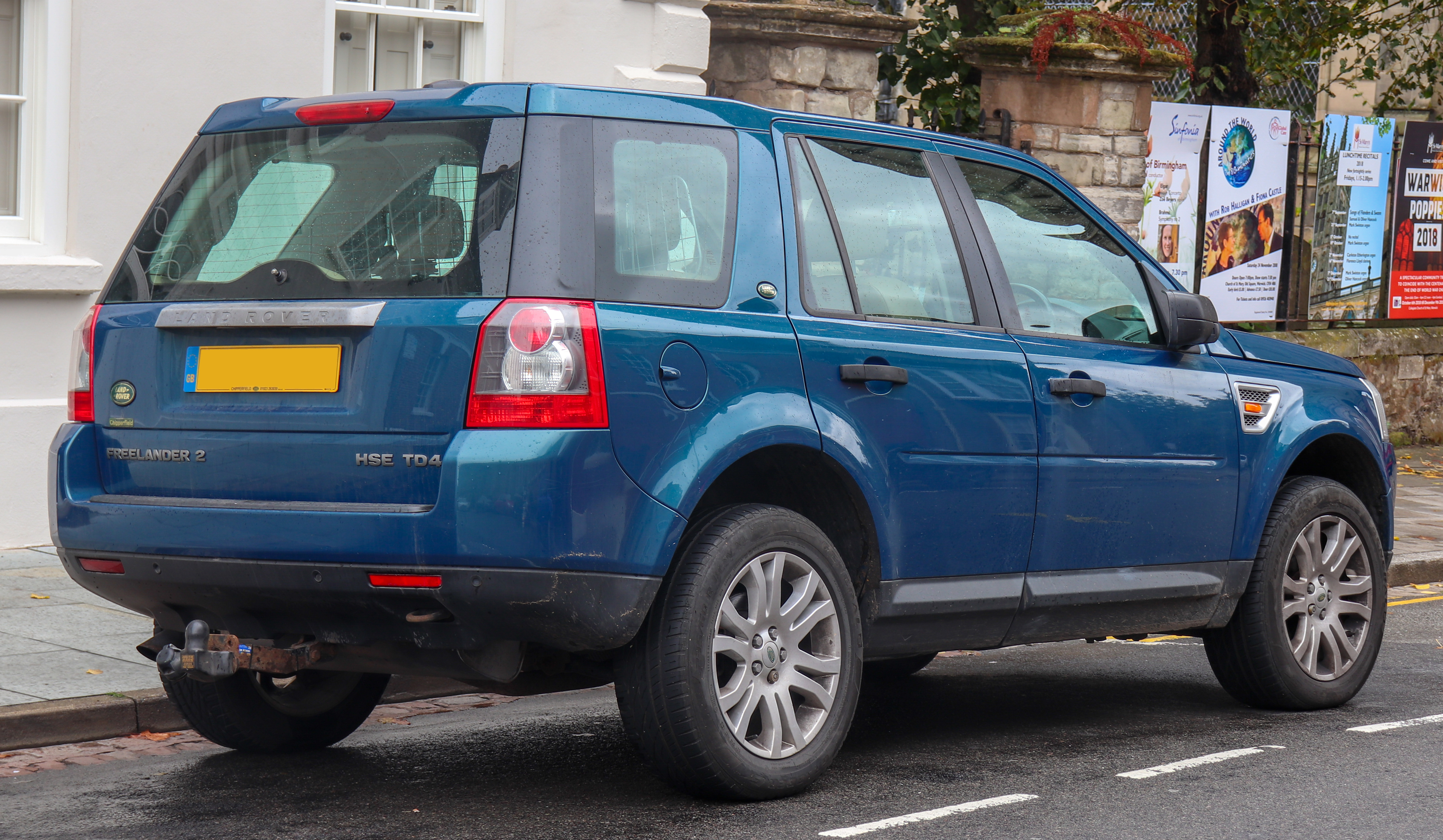
Pre-facelift Land Rover Freelander 2 HSE TD4

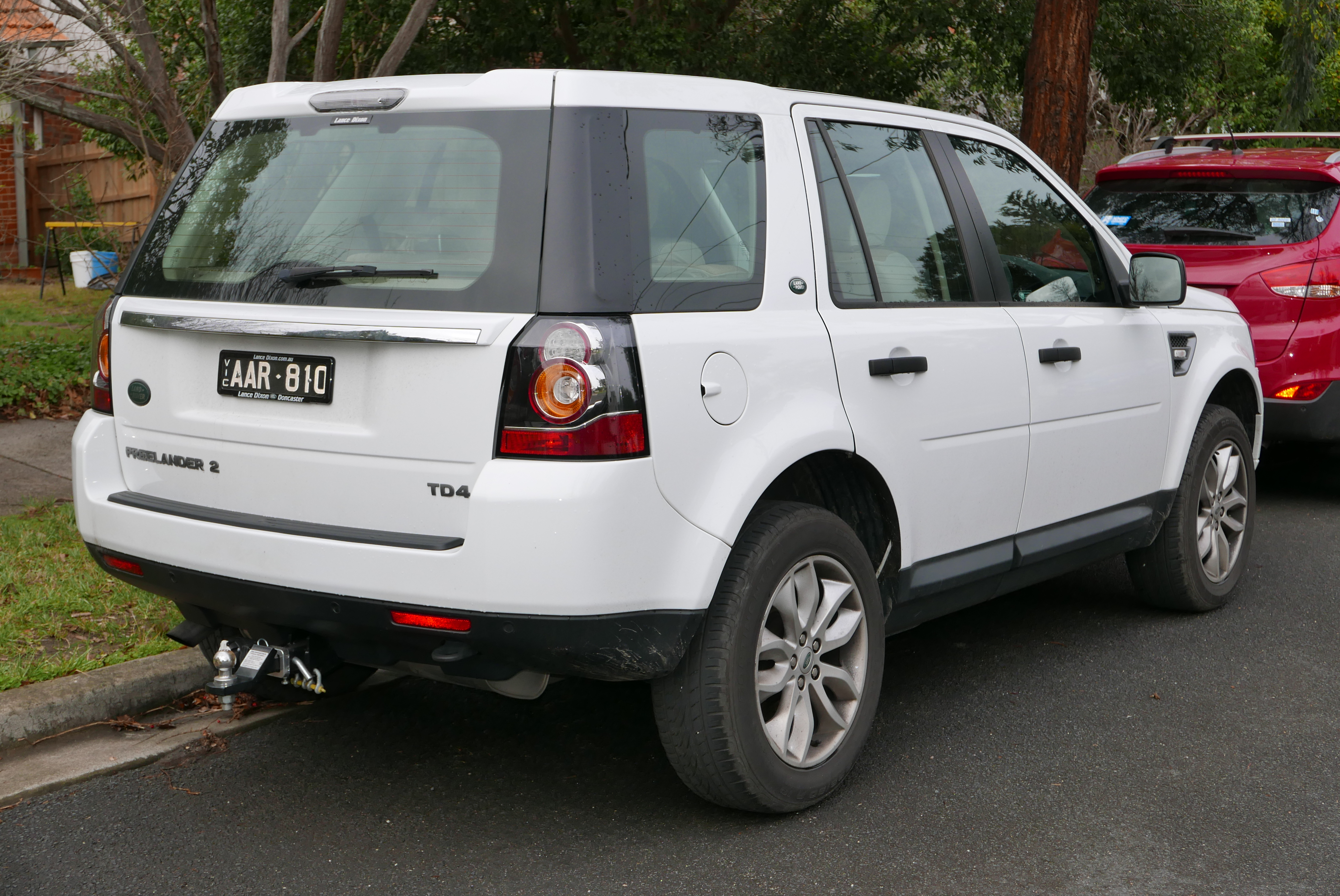
Facelift Land Rover Freelander TD4

The second generation Freelander is based on the Ford EUCD platform, which itself is based on the Ford C1 platform. The Ford EUCD platform will be used by more upcoming vehicles from Volvo. The engine range is all-new for Freelander, featuring transversely-mounted 3.2-litre straight-six engine of the Volvo SI6 series, which debuted in the new Volvo S80, as well as the 2.2-litre DW12 common rail turbodiesel engine from PSA Peugeot Citroën.

Unlike previous Land Rovers, the second generation Freelander is manufactured in the Halewood Body & Assembly facility, near Liverpool, and was until 2009 manufactured alongside the Jaguar X-Type, with which it shared a modified version of Ford's front wheel drive platform. The new Freelander features higher ground clearance and off-road capabilities that are closer to other Land Rover models.

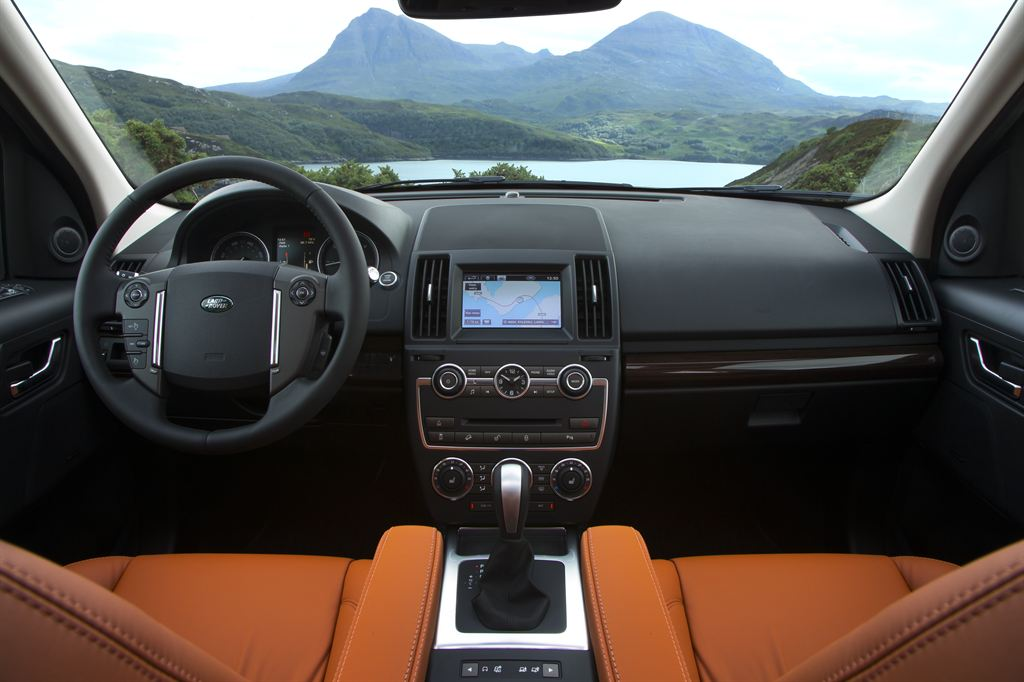
Interior

The second generation has improved quality interior with more safety features as standard. The Freelander 2 features a modified version of the Terrain Response off-road driving system as fitted to the Discovery 3 and the Range Rover. The 4WD system was developed in conjunction with Haldex and was called Third generation coupling. Vehicles from the 2009 model year are fitted with a modified design of the active on-demand coupling, known as Haldex's Fourth generation.

The new Freelander was first marketed in the U.S. in 2007 as the LR2. The 2008 version is called the LR2 HSE. The limited run HST had added side trim, front valance, and 19-inch wheels. A Volvo 3.2-litre inline six-cylinder engine producing 230 hp (170 kW) is standard, with a six-speed automatic transmission and all-wheel drive. In the United Kingdom, the standard engine is the PSA 2.2-litre turbo diesel. The eD4 version of the engine produces 150 hp (110 kW), the TD4 comes with 160 hp (120 kW), and the SD4 comes with 190 hp (140 kW).

Interior appointments include an Alpine 440-watt 14-speaker surround sound audio and a 7-inch touch navigation screen options, while the newer models can be equipped with an Meridian audio system, which comes with a surround sound 17-speaker system with Trifield technology, producing 825 watts.

The Meridian system is also equipped with subwoofers and Audyssey MultEQ audio tuning system. Also a 5-inch colour display screen is standard even at the newer entry-level models. An optional cold climate package includes heated front windscreen, heated front seats with two heating levels and heated windscreen washers. The optional lighting package includes bi-xenon headlights, adaptive front-lighting, memory for the driver seat, as well as exterior mirrors and approach and puddle lamps.

=== Freelander 2 TD4_e ===
The Freelander TD4_e features stop-start technology to improve fuel economy and reduce carbon emissions. The system cuts out the engine when the vehicle is stationary, neutral is selected and the clutch engaged; the engine restarts when the clutch pedal is depressed.

The system includes a heavy-duty starter motor that also acts as a generator to recover energy through regenerative braking that is then stored in capacitors to restart the engine reducing stress on the vehicle's battery and electrical system. The stop-start system became available in spring 2009 on Freelander 2 TD4 models.

=== Freelander 2 eD4 ===
For the first time in Land Rover's history, from the 2011 model year, a purely two-wheel drive version, badged eD4, was available. This model also dropped the Terrain Response and Hill Descent Control systems. Omitting four-wheel drive saved 75 kg (165 lb) of weight, and the eD4 achieved a combined economy figure of 47 mpg_{‑imp} (6 L/100 km), along with emissions of 158 g/km CO_{2}.

After introduction of the Range Rover Evoque in 2011, this model competed with the Freelander 2, especially with the eD4, as the Evoque was both cheaper to purchase, more efficient, more premium, and combined this with standard four-wheel drive.

For the 2013 model year, the Freelander got a revised look with a different grille, and new interior trim.

=== Safety ===
ANCAP test results* Land Rover Freelander 2 (2007)
Test	Score
Overall	5 /5 stars
Frontal offset	14.92/16
Side impact	15.92/16
Pole	2/2
Seat belt reminders	2/3
Whiplash protection	Not Assessed
Pedestrian protection	Poor
Electronic stability control	Standard

Euro NCAP test results* Land Rover Freelander 2 TD4 S (RHD) (2007)
Test	Score	Rating
Adult occupant:	40	5 /5 stars
Child occupant:	35	4 /5 stars
Pedestrian:	7	1 /4 stars

== Sales ==
Year	Sales
2009	37,910
2010	54,833
2011	51,954
2012	48,332
2013	57,691
2014	56,622
2015	3,278
Total	310,619

== Brand revival ==
In 2024, Jaguar Land Rover (JLR) and Chery Automobile signed a letter of intent outlining a strategic cooperation to revive the Freelander nameplate as a new electric vehicle brand. Under the agreement, Chery Jaguar Land Rover (CJLR), the companies’ joint venture in China, was authorized to develop and manufacture a new range of Freelander-branded electric vehicles.

The revived Freelander lineup is planned to be based on Chery’s electrified vehicle platforms, with engineering and development led primarily by Chery. Production is expected to take place in China, with the Chinese market serving as the initial launch region.

The first model under the reborn Freelander brand is expected to be a crossover-style electric vehicle. Design direction for the new model has been overseen by JLR’s Chief Creative Officer, Gerry McGovern. The new Freelander vehicles are positioned separately from Land Rover’s core model range and are intended to form a standalone lineup.

According to company statements, the new Freelander brand is scheduled to debut in late 2026, marking the first use of the Freelander name since its discontinuation in 2015.
