= Tota Venkova =

First native-born Bulgarian woman physician

- Теодора Венкова Чехларова
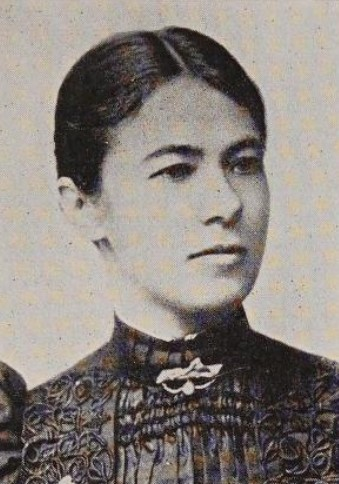
- Born: Teodora Venkova Chehlarova; 1855; Gabrovo, Ottoman Bulgaria
- Died: 23 December 1921 (aged 66); Sofia, Kingdom of Bulgaria
- Other names: Teodora Chehlarova, Tota Chehlarova
- Occupations: Teacher, physician
- Years active: 1873–1921

Teodora Venkova Chehlarova (Bulgarian: Теодора Венкова Чехларова; 1855 – 23 December 1921), known as Tota Venkova (Bulgarian: Тота Венкова), was a Bulgarian teacher and physician. She is widely credited as the first native woman to become a medical doctor in Bulgaria. (Note: Esther Pohl Lovejoy noted that the first Bulgarian physician to practice in Bulgaria was Anastasia Golovina, who earned her credentials in Switzerland in the 1870s. According to R. J. Crampton, Golovina was born in Chișinău, now in Moldova, and graduated after studies in Zürich, Switzerland and Paris, France. Scholar Georgeta Nazarska also called Golovina the first Bulgarian physician but noted that she was born in Bessarabia and graduated from the Sorbonne in 1878. Lovejoy and Nazarska both note that Нина Берова-Ораховац (Nina Berova-Orahovac), another Bessarabian Bulgarian, earned her credentials in 1885.) Orphaned at a young age, she was raised by her sister and given a scholarship by a charitable foundation to attend school, on the condition that she teach for five years after graduating. From 1873 to 1878 she taught at the Main Girls' School in Gabrovo. During the Russo-Turkish War, all of the schools in her hometown were turned into military hospitals and she worked as a volunteer nurse, deciding she wanted to study medicine.

Securing scholarships, Venkova studied in Saint Petersburg, Russia, became a physician and returned to Bulgaria. She worked in hospitals in Ruse, Tarnovo, and Varna before settling in Sofia. She completed specializations in internal medicine and pediatrics in 1893 in Saint Petersburg and in obstetrics and gynaecology in Vienna, Austria, in 1895. Returning to Sofia, she became the head of the maternity department at Aleksandrovska Hospital and was a founder and creator of the hospital's midwifery courses. Simultaneously she worked as a school doctor in 1899 and 1900. The following year, she opened a private practice and provided free medical consultations for disadvantaged women. She died in 1921 and left the bulk of her estate to institutions providing care for women and children. Streets, hospitals, and schools have been named in her honor and some of her belongings are housed at the Regional History Museum in Gabrovo.

== Early life and education ==
Teodora "Tota" Venkova Chehlarova (Note: Bulgarian names typically include a given name, patronymic, and surname. Surnames in Bulgaria came into use during the 19th century and were typically formed through use of a possessive suffix of the father's name. Unlike Russian surnames, often the patronymic name was used by subsequent generations as a surname, meaning that it changed in each generation. For example, "the son of Petŭr Stoi͡anov Ivanov would be Georgi Petrov Stoi͡anov, his son would be Asen Georgiev Petrov", etc. Another feature of Bulgarian surnames is that sometimes the last name is dropped entirely and the patronymic is used as the surname.) was born in the spring of 1855, in Gabrovo, Ottoman Bulgaria, to Maria and Venko Chehlara. Her father worked as a craftsman and the family was poor. Orphaned in her childhood, Venkova was raised in the household of her sister Radka and her husband Nestor Minevski. The Mother's Care Charitable Society agreed to pay for her education as a teacher, as long as she promised to teach for five years. She enrolled in the Main Girls' School in 1871, and studied under Anastasia Tosheva. She completed her studies in 1873, in the first graduating class of fifth term students from the school.

== Career ==
=== Teaching (1873–1878) ===
In August 1873, Venkova was assigned to teach fifth grade at the Main Girls' School and taught through August 1878. During that time, the April Uprising of 1876 began, followed by the Russo-Turkish War (1877–1878). After the Battle of Shipka Pass all of the schools in Gabrovo were converted to military hospitals. Venkova worked as a volunteer nurse in the infirmary at the Aprilov High School. She fell in love with one of her patients, Ivan Jancic, a young Russian physician who had been shot in the leg. Gangrene set in and he underwent an amputation, but within two days died from sepsis, leaving Venkova, who never married, determined to become a healer. She erected a tombstone for Jancic and ensured his name carved on the Doctor's Monument in the Doctors' Garden of Sofia. A Russian doctor who was being housed in her home encouraged her aspirations and helped Venkova apply to the Saint Petersburg Women's Charity Society for assistance. The society provided a scholarship for her travel and for her to begin studies in September 1878. (Note: Women were forbidden to attend university in Russia under an 1863 statute, although previously they had been allowed to audit lectures. Gradually, private women's institutions offered higher education opportunities after 1869, the year that the Alarchinsky Courses began in Saint Petersburg and the Lubyanka Women's Courses opened in Moscow. In 1872, the Medical-Surgical Academy opened in Saint Petersburg, teaching medical science and midwifery. It was renamed as the St. Petersburg Higher Women's Medical Courses in 1876 and operated until 1882. The only available courses for women to study medicine after 1882 was through private hospitals or the Bestuzhev Courses and admission to medical education was completely suspended for women from 12 May 1886.)

=== Medicine (1878–1921) ===
Venkova traveled to Saint Petersburg and studied for one year, before she developed pneumonia, and had to return to her sister's home. After a lengthy recovery period, she returned to Saint Petersburg in 1883, on a scholarship from the Bulgarian Ministry of National Education. Graduating in 1886, she returned to Bulgaria and completed her residency at the Русенската първокласна болница (First Class Hospital of Ruse). She then worked at the hospitals in Tarnovo and Varna before settling in Sofia. Venkova returned to Saint Petersburg to complete a specialization in internal medicine and pediatric diseases in 1893. Two years later, she completed a specialty in obstetrics and gynaecology in Vienna, Austria.

In 1895, Venkova became the head of the maternity department at Aleksandrovska Hospital in Sofia. She founded and designed the curricula for midwifery courses which she taught at the hospital. These were the first courses to train women in the profession in Bulgaria and as the assistant chief, she was one of the very few women who held supervisory positions at the time. Simultaneously, she worked as a school doctor for the Sofia Girls' High School from 1899 through 1900. In 1901, she left the hospital primarily because of health reasons and opened a private practice. Working out of her home at 13 Solunska Street, Venkova operated a clinic for disadvantaged women, which was supported by philanthropic women because she did not charge for her services.

== Death and legacy ==
Venkova died from heart failure at her home in Sofia on 23 December 1921 and was buried the Central Sofia Cemetery. In her will she provided for the education of her nieces and nephews and then left her estate to various institutions, including half a million lev each for the construction of a 40-bed pavilion bearing her name for children at the Tubercular Sanitorium in Iskrets; the construction of the Children's Forest Climate School, a children's summer camp, in Zeleno darvo; and for the benefit of the Gabrovo Girls' School. She also gave forty thousand lev to the University of Sofia. She is widely remembered as the first native-born Bulgarian doctor.

In 1971, the regional hospital in Gabrovo was renamed in her honor. A street in Gabrovo was named after her in 1997, the year that her remains were re-interred in her home town. In 2002 a scholarship fund in her name was established by the Mother's Care Society for the Aprilov High School and in 2005, she was made an honorary citizen of Gabrovo. The Regional History Museum in Gabrovo maintains a collection of artifacts that belonged to Venkova, such as her silver cutlery set, a porcelain plate from the Iskretch sanatorium, her letter seal, a hand-embroidered blanket made by a patient, and her family donated her photographs, documents and other memorabilia to the Mother's Care Society. In 2020, a memorial plaque was mounted on her former home in Sofia.
