= Camel Trophy =

Annual off-road rally, 1980–2000

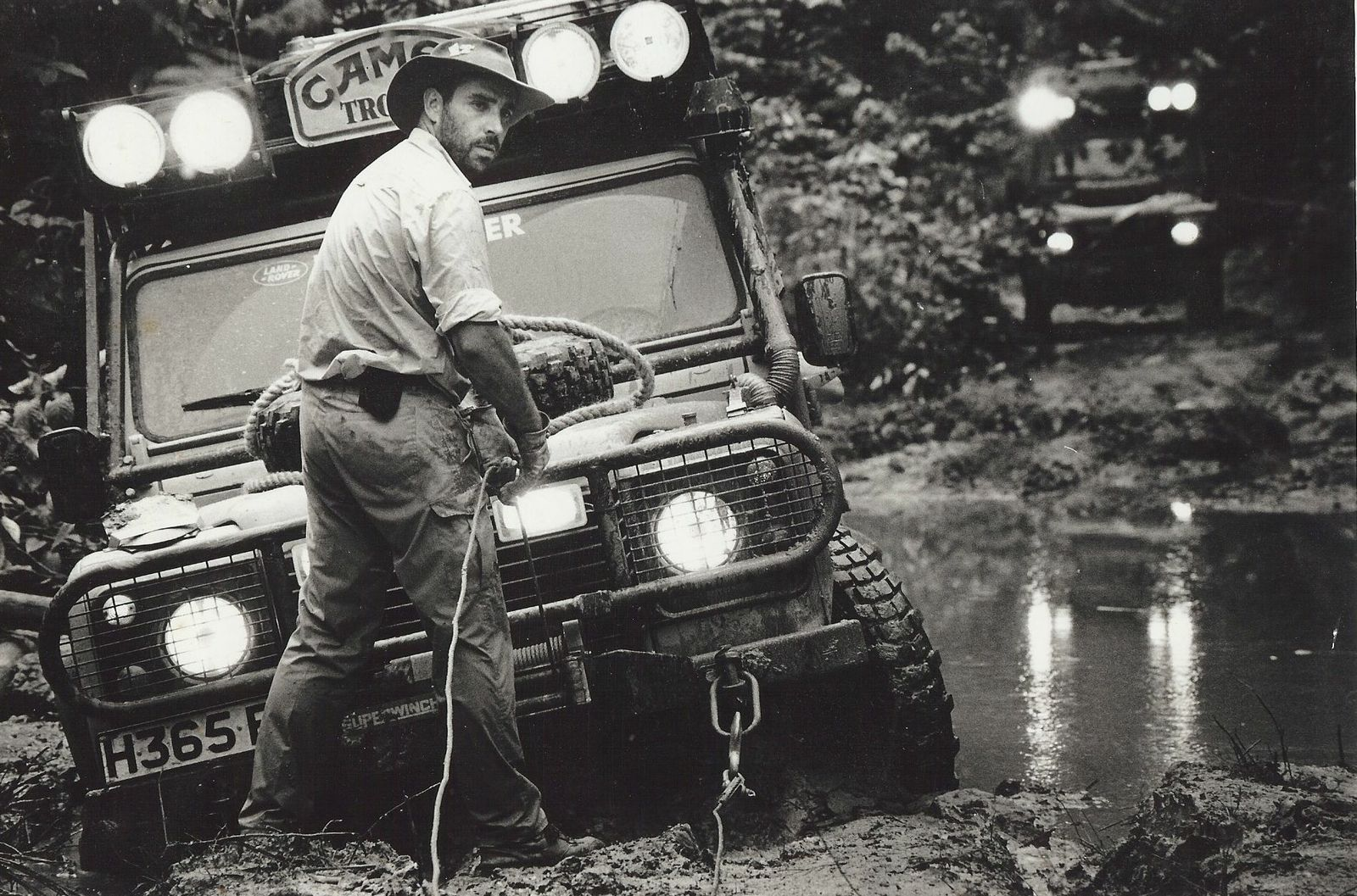
A pre-scout expedition in 1991 in Guyana to explore the route for the Trophy 1992 planned to happen there. The vehicles are Land Rover Defender 110.

Camel Trophy was an off-road vehicle-oriented competition that was held annually between 1980 and 2000. It was best known for its use of Land Rover vehicles over challenging terrain. Occasionally called "The Olympics of 4x4", the event took its name from its main sponsor, the Camel cigarette brand.

== Vehicles ==
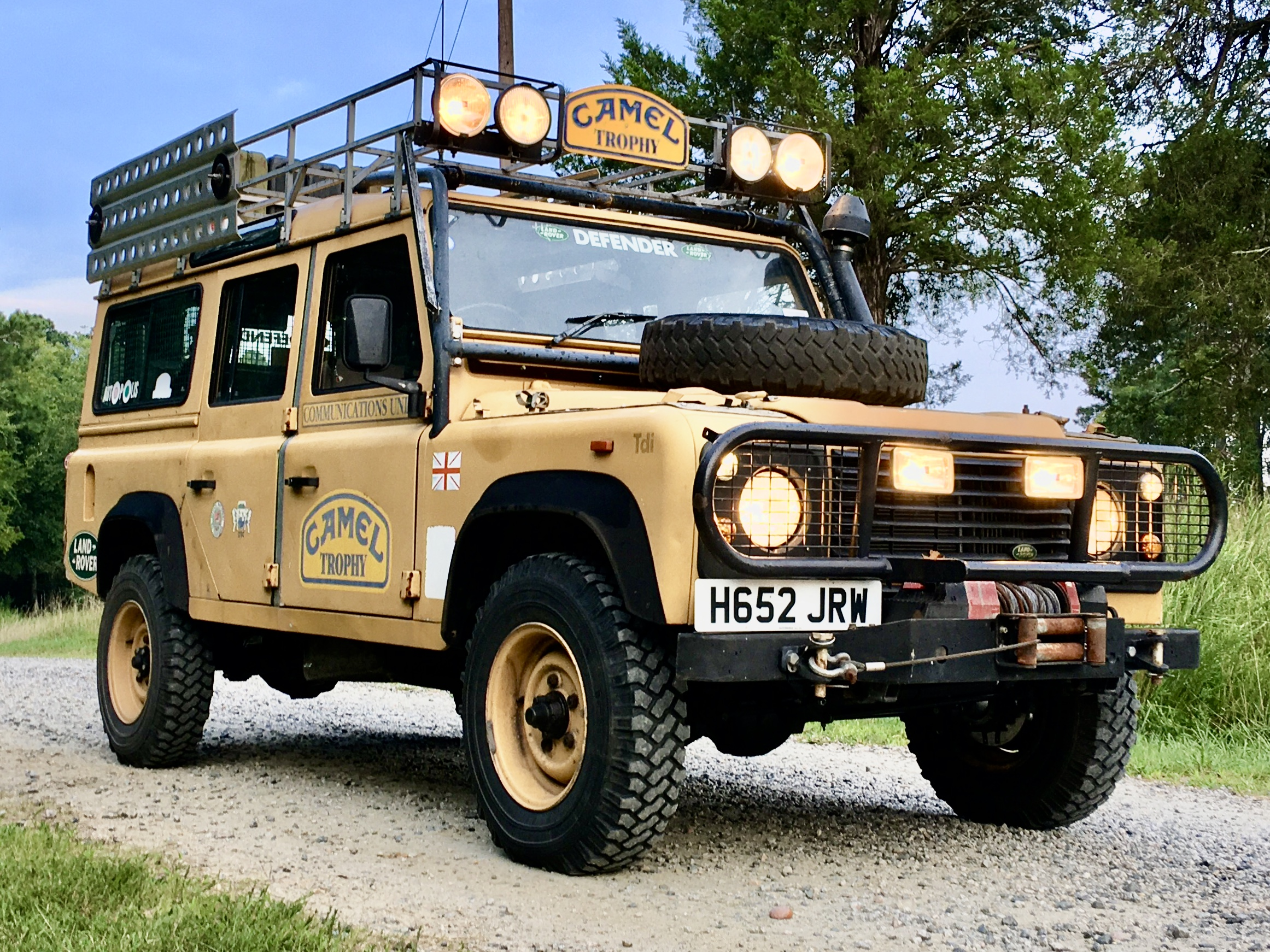
Camel Trophy Land Rover Defender 110 '91 Tanzania-Burundi Communications Unit

Camel Trophy originated in 1980 with three Jeep-equipped German teams exploring the Amazon Basin. After that first event, the organisers turned to Land Rover for support and over the course of the next twenty years, all of the Land Rover vehicle range were used. Range Rover, Land Rover Series III, Land Rover 90, Land Rover 110, Land Rover Defender, Land Rover Discovery, and Land Rover Freelander vehicles all appeared in the events in the distinctive "sandglow" colour scheme.

The cars were heavily modified by Land Rover Special Vehicles with a range of expedition, recovery, and safety equipment, including:

- Safety Devices roll cages
- Under body protection (skid plates) and steering guards
- Modified electrical systems
- Winches
- Dixon Bate tow hitches and recovery points
- Mantec snorkels
- Transmission breathers
- Michelin XCL or BF Goodrich Mud Terrain tyres
- Upgraded suspension and transmission components
- Auxiliary fuel tanks
- Webasto fuel burning heaters
- Brownchurch / Safety Devices roof racks
- Hella driving, spot, fog, convoy and work lamps
- Brownchurch Bull bars and bush wires
- Flag poles
- Event plaques, decals and sponsor logos (including Camel Trophy Adventure Wear/Bags/Boots/Watches, Lee Cougan, Perception, Sony, Scott USA, Safety Devices, Land Rover, Fjällräven, Warn, Malaysia Airlines, Superwinch, Royal Dutch Shell, Shell, Avon)
- Expedition tools, Jerry cans, Pelican cases, Zarges boxes, high lift or New Concept air jacks, sand ladders, axes, ropes, drawbars, spades.
- Garmin, Terratrip and other navigation and communication equipment

Generally speaking, except for support and specialist vehicles, the Land Rovers were only used for one event. Some competitors purchased their vehicles and many remained in the host country. Consequently, those vehicles that returned to the United Kingdom were highly sought after as they were low mileage - but they were "Camel Trophy miles". They were stripped of most of their equipment by Land Rover before they were released, making restoring the vehicles to their original competition condition expensive and time-consuming.

== List of events and vehicles used ==
Year	Location	Team vehicles	Support vehicles
1980	Brazil	Ford U50's (License built Jeep CJ5's)	
1981	Sumatra (Indonesia)	Range Rover	Range Rover
1982	Papua New Guinea	Range Rover	Range Rover
1983	Zaire	Land Rover Series III 88"	Land Rover Series III 109"
1984	Brazil	Land Rover 110	Land Rover 110
1985	Borneo (Indonesia)	Land Rover 90	Land Rover 110
1986	Australia	Land Rover 90	Land Rover 110
1987	Madagascar	Range Rover TD	Range Rover TD
1988	Sulawesi (Indonesia)	Land Rover 110	Land Rover 110
1989	Brazil	Land Rover 110	Land Rover 110
1990	Siberia (USSR)	Discovery 200tdi (3-door)	Defender 110 & 127"
1991	Tanzania Burundi	Discovery 200tdi	Land Rover One Ten
1992	Guyana	Discovery 200tdi	Defender 110 200tdi
1993	Sabah, Malaysia	Discovery 200tdi	Defender 110 200tdi
1994	Argentina Paraguay Chile	Discovery 200tdi	Defender 110 200tdi
1995	Mundo Maya (Belize, Guatemala, El Salvador, Honduras, Mexico)	Discovery 300tdi	Defender 110 300tdi
1996	Kalimantan	Discovery 300tdi	Defender 110 300tdi
1997	Mongolia	Discovery 300tdi	Defender 110 300tdi
1998	Tierra del Fuego	Freelander	Defender 110 300tdi
2000	Tonga-Samoa	Ribtec 655	Defender 110 HCPU and Honda CRV

== Event results ==
Over the 18-year period in which the Camel Trophy featured Land Rover vehicles, Italian teams ultimately won the Camel Trophy three times - in 1982, 1984, and 1987. Teams from the Netherlands, France, Germany, and Turkey all won the Camel Trophy twice.

Year	Camel Trophy winners	Winners' names	Team Spirit Award	Special Tasks Award	Land Rover Award
1980	N/A	Klaus Karttna-Dircks and Uwe Machel	N/A	N/A	N/A
1981	West Germany	Christian Swoboda and Knuth Mentel	N/A	N/A	N/A
1982	Italy	Cesare Geraudo and Giuliano Giongo	N/A	N/A	N/A
1983	The Netherlands	Henk Bont and Frans Heij	N/A	N/A	N/A
1984	Italy	Maurizo Levi and Alfredo Redaelli	N/A	N/A	N/A
1985	Germany	Heinz Kallin and Bernd Strohdach	Brazil	N/A	N/A
1986	France	Jaques Mambre and Michel Courvallet	Australia	N/A	N/A
1987	Italy	Mauro Miele and Vincenzo Tota	Spain	N/A	N/A
1988	Turkey	Galip Gurel and Ali Deveci	UK	N/A	N/A
1989	UK	Bob Ives and Joe Ives	Belgium	N/A	N/A
1990	The Netherlands	Rob Kamps and Stijn Luyx	Spain - Canary Islands	N/A	N/A
1991	Turkey	Menderes Utku and Bulent Ozler	Turkey	Austria	N/A
1992	Switzerland	Alwin Arnold and Urs Bruggisser	USA	France	N/A
1993	USA	Tim Hensley and Michael Hussey	Spain - Canary Islands	France	N/A
1994	Spain	Carlos Martinez and Jorge Corella	South Africa	Spain	N/A
1995	Czech Republic	Zdeněk Němec and Marek Ročejdl	Russia	Czech Republic	N/A
1996	Greece	Miltos Farmakis and Nikos Sotirchos	South Africa	Russia	Greece
1997	Austria	Stefan Auer and Albrecht Thousing	Sweden	N/A	Mihai Mares and Manu Cornel, Romania.
1998	France	William Michael and Marc Challamel	South Africa	N/A	Spain

== Camel Trophy's successor: the "G4 Challenge" ==
In 2003, competitors representing sixteen nations helped Land Rover fill the gap left after the demise of Camel Trophy. The inaugural Land Rover G4 Challenge contained many of the elements of Camel Trophy 1998, which Land Rover had reportedly been disappointed with. The "ultimate global adventure" was a test of skill, stamina, and mental agility in four separate stages, each in a different time zone. The prize was a top-of-the-range Freelander or Range Rover. The winner Rudi Thoelen declined a Range Rover, and opted for two Defenders instead.

The 2006 Land Rover G4 Challenge promised to be tougher than the inaugural event and delivered a more vehicle-based focus. The competitors, working in bi-national teams faced thousands of miles of vehicle-based activity in Thailand, Laos, Brazil, and Bolivia.

The 2008-9 G4 Challenge, supporting the Red Cross and based in Mongolia, was cancelled in December 2008 in the middle of the selection stages due to the global economic downturn. Land Rover were forced to end the event as a cost saving-measure to allow them to focus on product launches in 2009.

== See also ==
- Camel (cigarette)
- Land Rover
- Land Rover Series
- Land Rover Defender
- Range Rover Classic
- Land Rover Discovery
- Land Rover Freelander

== Bibliography ==
- Nick Dimbleby (1 December 2021). Camel Trophy: The Definitive History. Porter Press International. ISBN 978-1913089375.
