= Land Rover Aqaba Assembly Plant =

Motor vehicle manufacturing plant in Aqaba, Jordan

The Land Rover Aqaba Assembly Plant Co., Ltd. was a joint venture between the Land Rover brand, the Shahin Group and Ole Automotive. It was founded on 18 February 2001, and is located in the Ma'an Governorate close to the Aqaba Special Economic Zone in Jordan. There was a capital of 70 million dinar injected to build this plant. About 1,000 workers are employed there, assembling 5,000 units annually.

The first products assembled at the plant were the Defender and Discovery 2. The components for the vehicles were obtained in kits sent from the Solihull plant in the United Kingdom. The kits were delivered to the Port of Aqaba and were subsequently transported to the assembly plant.

As of 2024, there are currently no Land Rover models manufactured the Aqaba plant.

== Models formerly in production ==
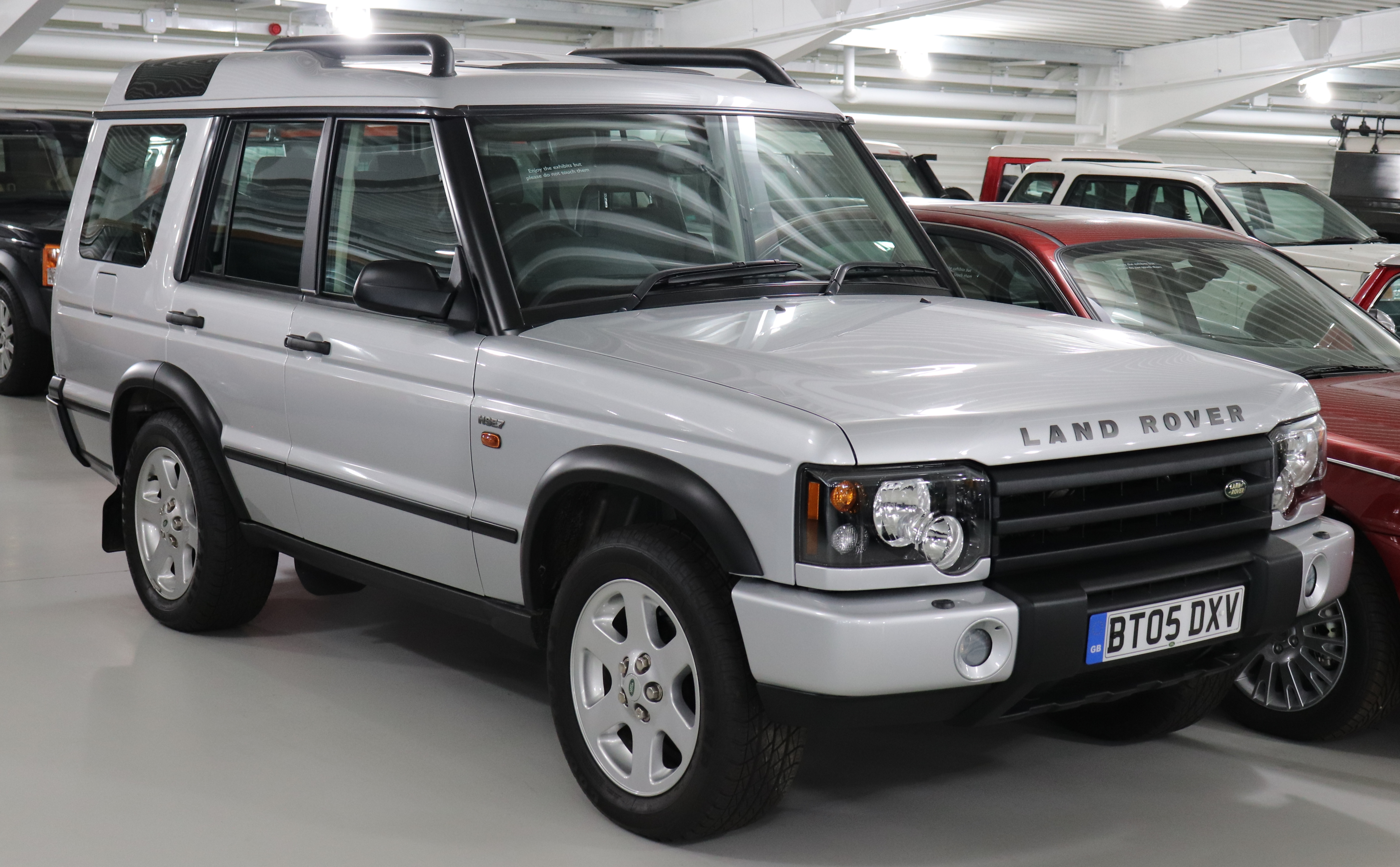
Land Rover Discovery 2
2002–2004

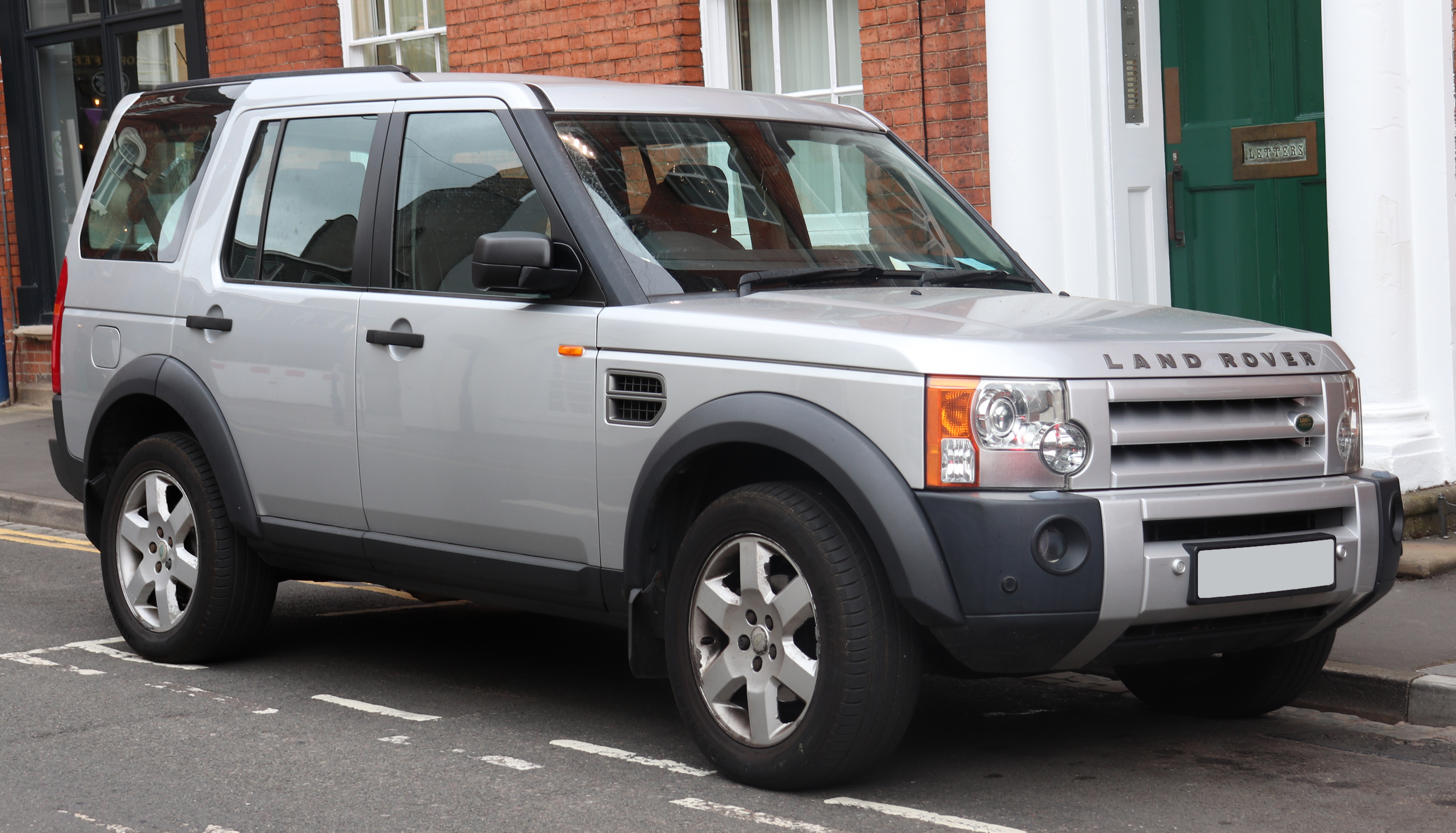
Land Rover Discovery 3
2004–2009

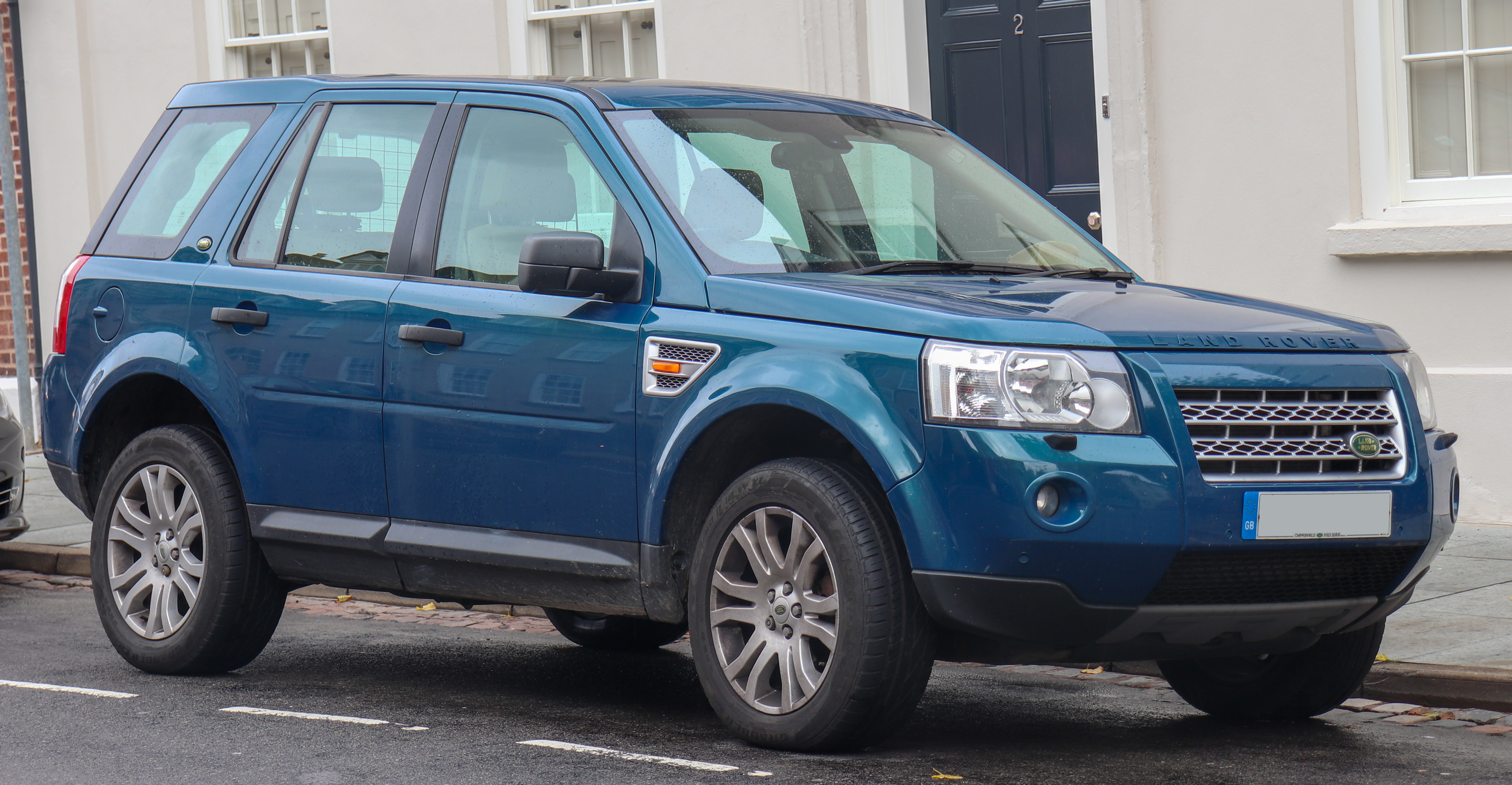
Land Rover Freelander 2
2008–2014

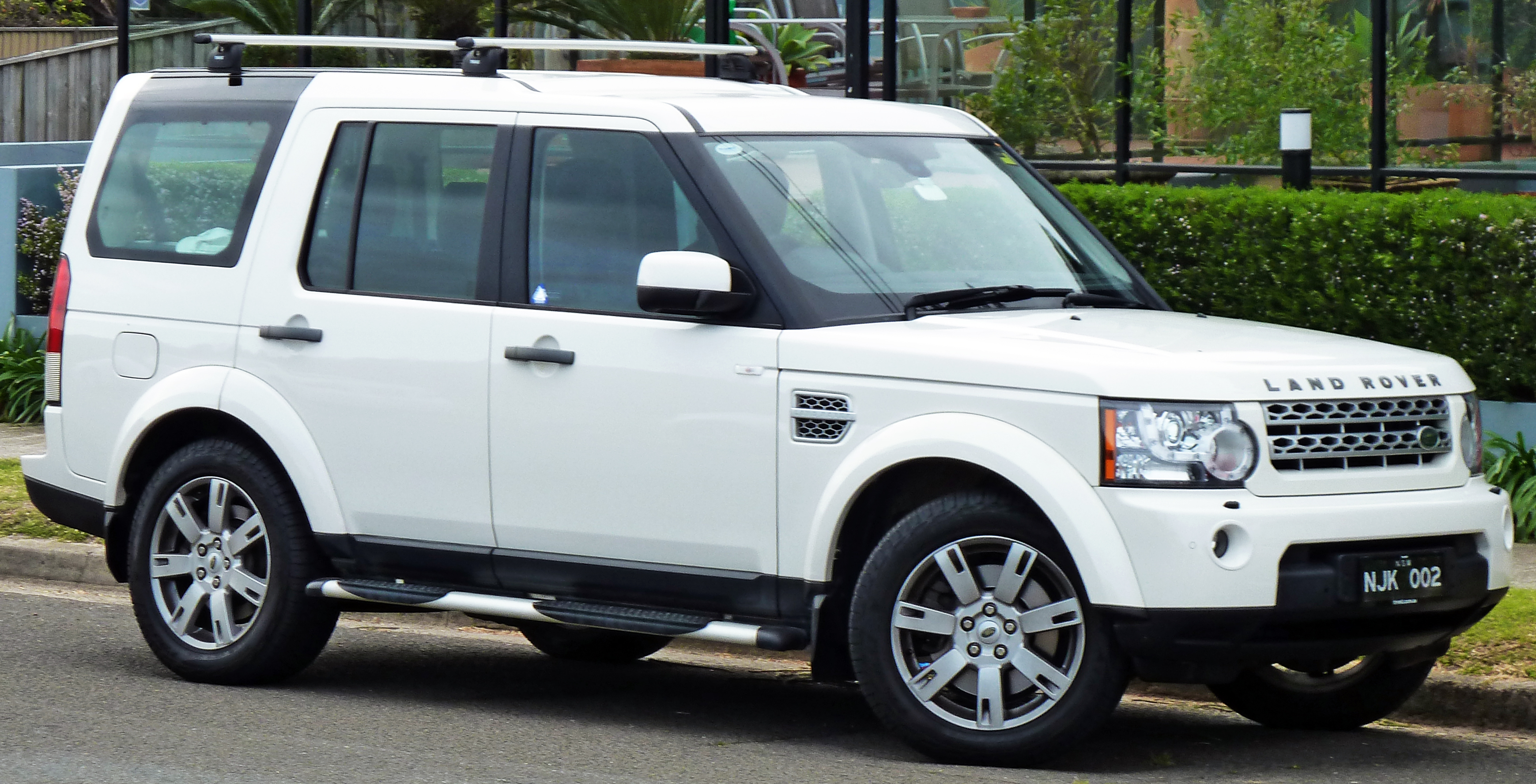
Land Rover Discovery 4
2009–2016

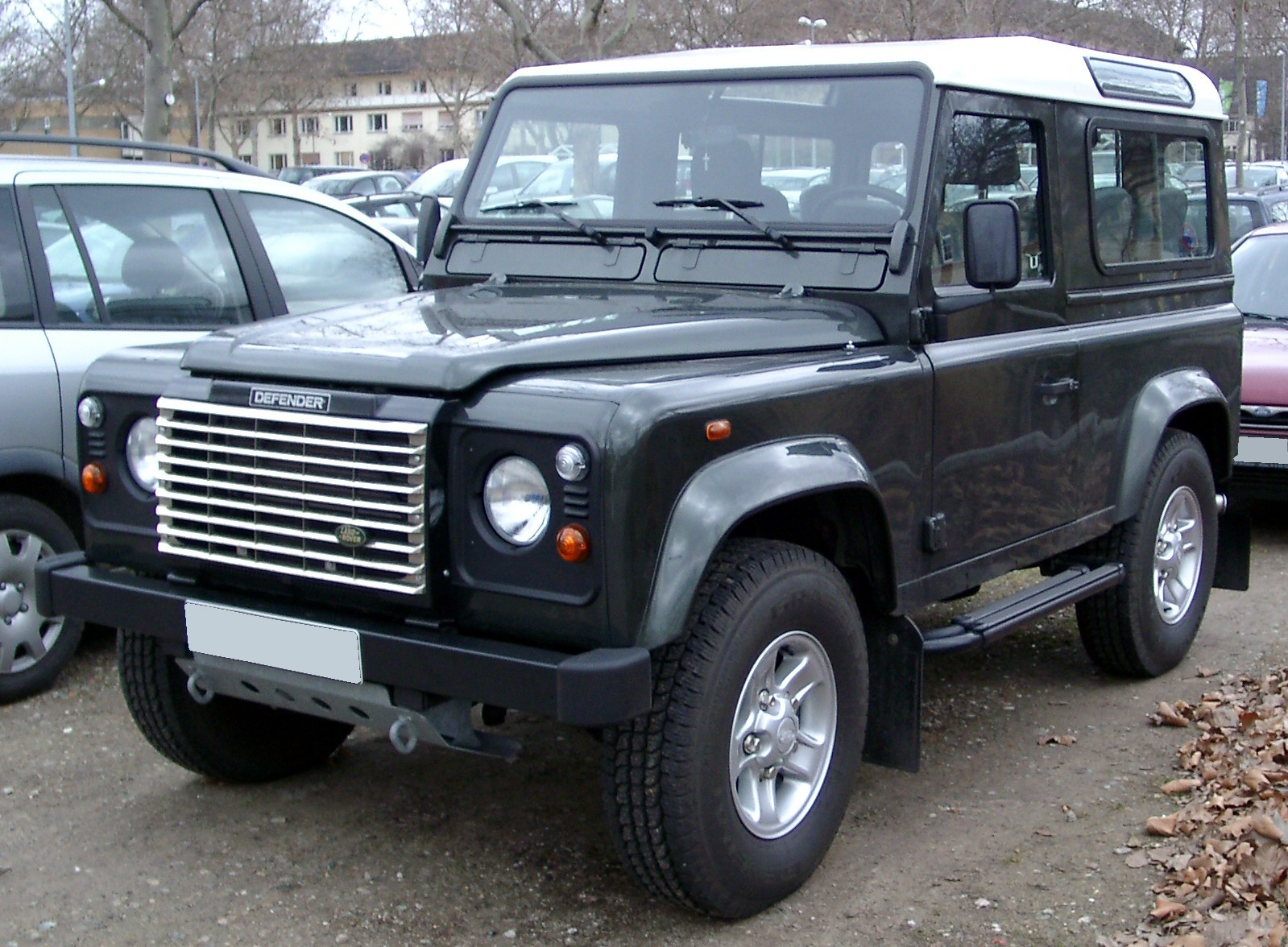
Land Rover Defender
2002–2016
