= Bob Ives (Camel Trophy winner) =

Camel Trophy winner and off-road advisor

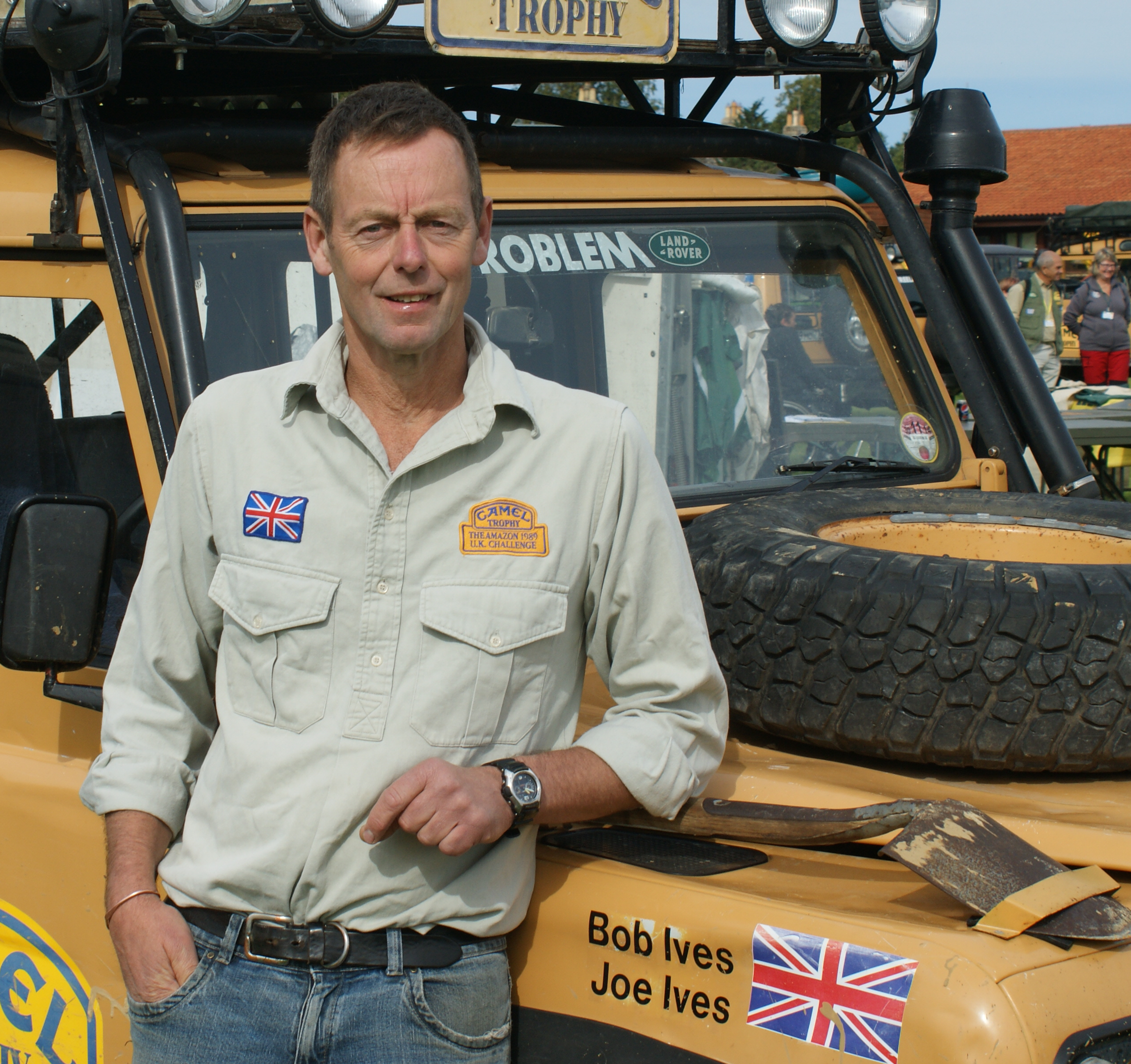
- Bob Ives at the 35th Camel Trophy reunion in 2015
- Born: Hampshire, UK
- Education: Lord Wandsworth College Hampshire
- Occupation(s): Off-road advisor, TV crew and Farmer
- Employer(s): BBC, W. Chump & Sons, Expectation Entertainment, Grand Tour Productions and Wildtrackers
- Known for: Along with his brother, Joe: Winning the Camel Trophy in 1989, both being awarded the RAC Segrave Trophy the same year, and being a Fellow of the Royal Geographical Society

Robert 'Bob' Ives was the 1989 Camel Trophy winner, along with his brother, Joe, and an off-road advisor for Top Gear and The Grand Tour special features.

== Early life ==
Robert 'Bob' Ives, was born in the early 1960s, and grew up on the family farm in Hampshire.

He went to school at Herriard Primary School and went on to secondary education at Lord Wandsworth College, where he passed seven O-levels and two GCSEs.

Ives got in to off-road driving and motorcycling during two year-long trips, driving and working around Australia. In 1979 in an old Toyota Land Cruiser and again in 1982 on a Suzuki DR-Z400.

On his return to the UK he competed in competitive off-road trials with the All Wheel Drive Club (AWDC), in Land Rovers and Range Rovers.

== Camel Trophy ==
In 1985 Ives took part in trials to become a member of the British team on the Camel Trophy challenge event, making the final four. He got to final selections every year, until finally making one half of the UK team for the 1989 Brazil event, along with his brother, Joe Ives.

After nearly three weeks and 1000 miles, the Ives brothers became the only UK team ever to win this gruelling 4x4 event, which ran from 1980 until 2000.

In recognition of their achievement the brothers were awarded the Royal Automobile Club (RAC) Segrave Trophy, awarded to British nationals who accomplish the most outstanding demonstration of the possibilities of transport by land, sea, air, or water. Other recipients included; Sir Stirling Moss, Sir Lewis Hamilton MBE and John Blashford-Snell OBE

Camel Trophy competitors were only permitted to participate once, but Ives went on to help run further Camel Trophy events. Siberia (1990), Tanzania/Burundi (1991), Guyana (1992), Argentina/Paraguay/Chile (1994), Belize, Mexico, Guatemala, El Salvador, Honduras (1995) and Kalimantan (1996).

== After the Camel Trophy ==
Despite being asked to continue supporting the Camel Trophy, Ives made the decision, in 1996, to take part in International Rally Raid events. In a heavily modified 300 hp Land Rover Defender, he participated in the 1997 Baja Espana (retired due to electrical problems) and the 1998 UAE Desert Challenge, starting the last day in fourth place, but sadly a broken UJ in the front prop shaft, resulted in a 24th-place finish in two wheel drive.

The following years were filled with many off-road incentive trips for self drive groups and off-road vehicle launches for Land Rover, Jeep and Mercedes in remote parts of Jordan, USA, Turkey, UAE, Oman, Canada, Zambia, Botswana, Romania, Japan, Poland, South Africa, Thailand and Morocco. Ives also supported filming with various 'Barbour All Terrain Tracking' (BATT) vehicles on Sleepy Hollow and Harry Potter movies and various TV shows.

To pursue this enterprise Ives established Wildtrackers: The Remote Location Specialists. A team of independent consultants, who stage various vehicle projects in remote locations around the world.

Ives' off-road experience led him to being the go-to off-road expert for all the Top Gear 'Specials' since 2009. And latterly with The Grand Tour, advising on the routes during recces, then driving the lead camera tracking car during the two or three weeks of filming. Being responsible for many car gags, recovery and maintenance.

=== Top Gear productions ===
Produced by the BBC

- 2009 Bolivia Special: Bolivia, Chile
- 2010 Middle East Special: Iraq, Turkey, Syria, Jordan, Israel and Palestine
- 2011 India Special: India
- 2011 Snobine Harvester feature: Norway
- 2012 Africa Special: Uganda, Rwanda and Tanzania
- 2013 Burma Special: Myanmar and Thailand
- 2014 Patagonia Special: Argentina and Chile
- 2014 AMG 6x6 G Wagon feature: Abu Dhabi
- 2014 Claerwen Dam winch up in Series One Land Rover test: Wales
- 2014 Rescuing Richard Hammond from Wolf Mountain with the Hennessey Velociraptor: Canada
- 2015 New Top Gear recce: (Chris Evans, Matt Le Blanc and Eddie Irvine): South Africa, Kazakhstan
- 2016 Avtoros Shaman feature: Isle of Man
- 2016 The Beach (Buggy) Boys Special:Namibia
- 2019 Brunei Special: Brunei
- 2019 Ethiopia Special: Ethiopia
- 2019 Nepal Special: Nepal
- 2021 New Defender, G-Wagon and Arial Nomad 'Field Trip': Scotland
- 2021 Range Rover, Rolls Royce and Rally Chevette feature: Iceland
- 2022 New Range Rover feature: Walters Arena: Wales
- 2022 Pick Ups feature: Thailand

=== Top Gear Australia productions ===
Produced by BBC Studios

- 2024 Colombia feature: Colombia

=== Grand Tour productions ===
Commissioned by Amazon Prime Video

- 2016 'Ripshaw' feature: Dubai
- 2017 'Feed The World' special: Mozambique
- 2017 'Jaaaags' feature: Colorado
- 2017 'Oh Canada' feature: Canada
- 2018 Colombia Special: Colombia
- 2018 Mongolia, Survival of the Fattest Special: Mongolia and Arizona
- 2018 'Pick up Put Downs' feature – History of European pick up trucks: UK
- 2019 'A Massive Hunt' Special: Madagascar
- 2020 Siberia recce: Siberia
- 2020 Western Russia recce: Russia
- 2020 Lockdown Special: Scotland
- 2021 'Carnage A Trois' special: United Kingdom
- 2022 'Scandi Flic' feature: Norway, Sweden and Finland
- 2022 'Eurocrash' feature: Poland, Chechnya, Hungary, Slovenia, Thailand and Albania
- 2023 'Sand Job' feature: Mauritania and Senegal
- 2023 Zimbabwe feature: Zimbabwe
