= Doctors' Garden =

Park in Sofia, Bulgaria

Coordinates: 42°41′40″N 23°20′18″E

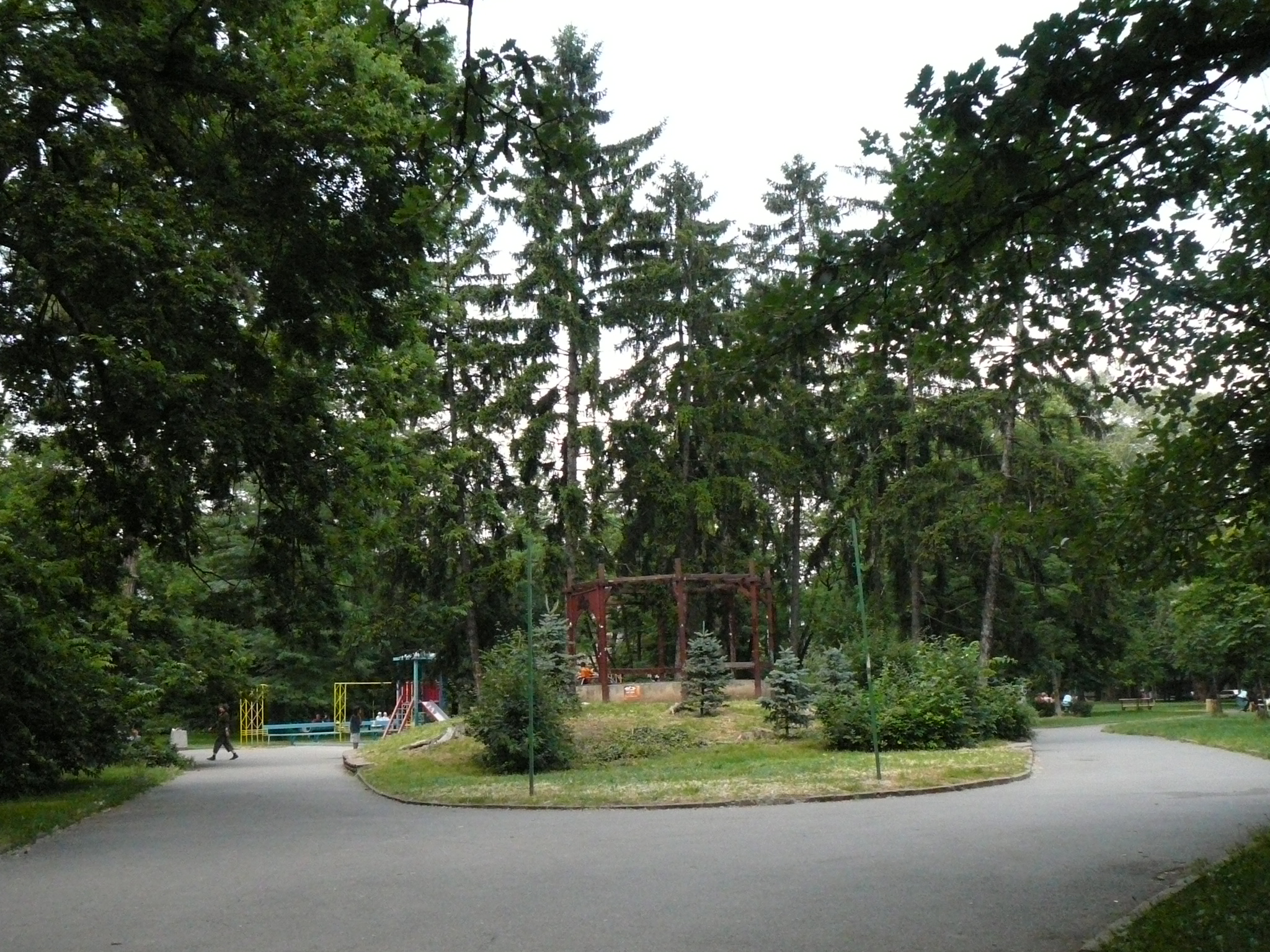
The Doctor Garden.

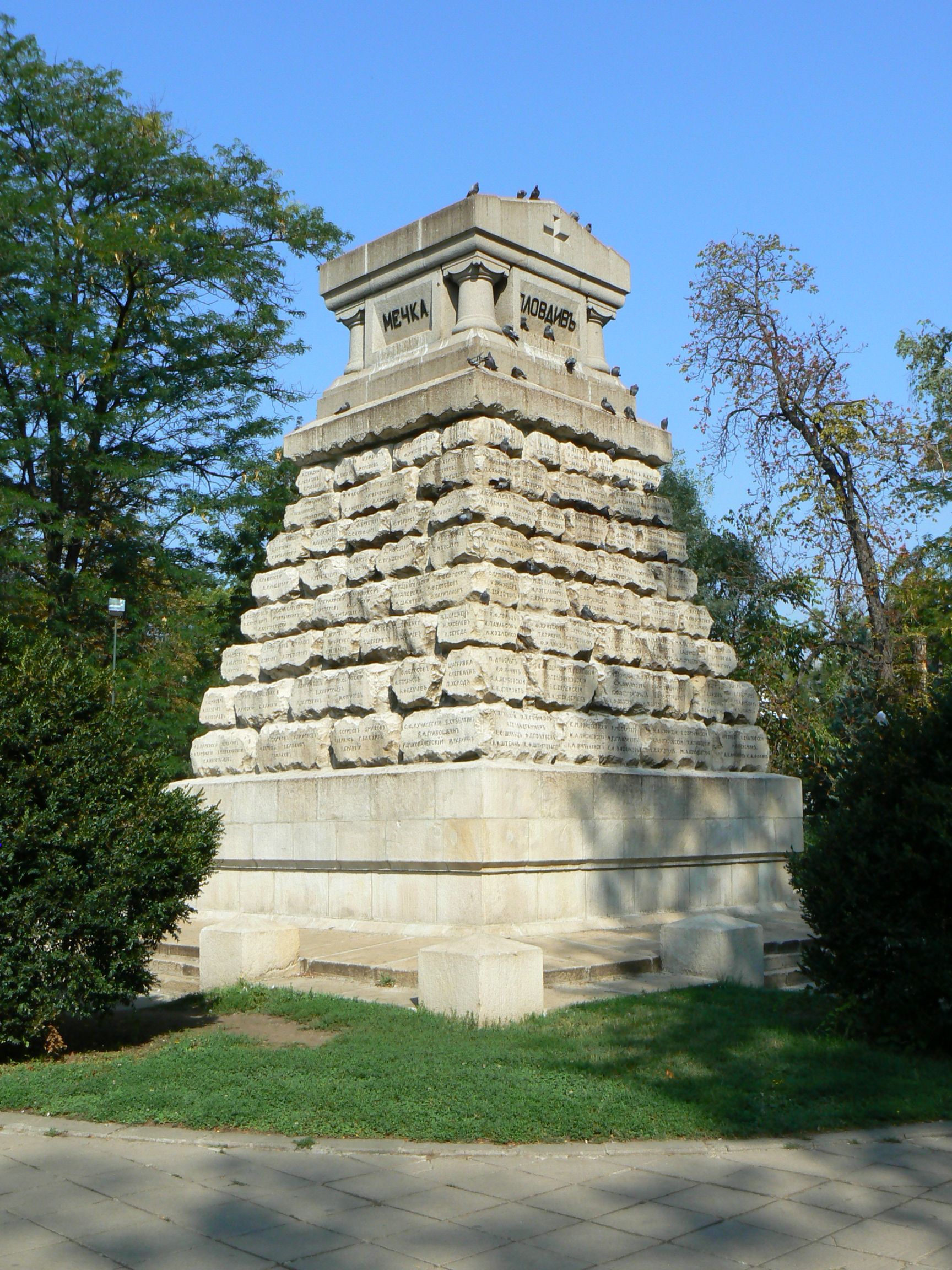
The Monument of the fallen medic, known as the Doctor Monument.

The Doctors' Garden (Bulgarian: Докторска градина, Doktorska gradina) is a park in the Bulgarian capital Sofia between the Oborishte and Shipka streets. It is located behind the SS. Cyril and Methodius National Library and close to many of the historical monuments and state institutions in the capital.

The park is named after the monument of the fallen medics during the Russo-Turkish War (1877–1878), most of whom worked for the mission of the Russian Red Cross Society and perished in the battles at Pleven, Plovdiv, Mechka and Shipka. The monument was constructed between 1883 and 1884 by the Russian architect of Czech origin Antoniy Osipovich Tomishko.

== Gallery ==
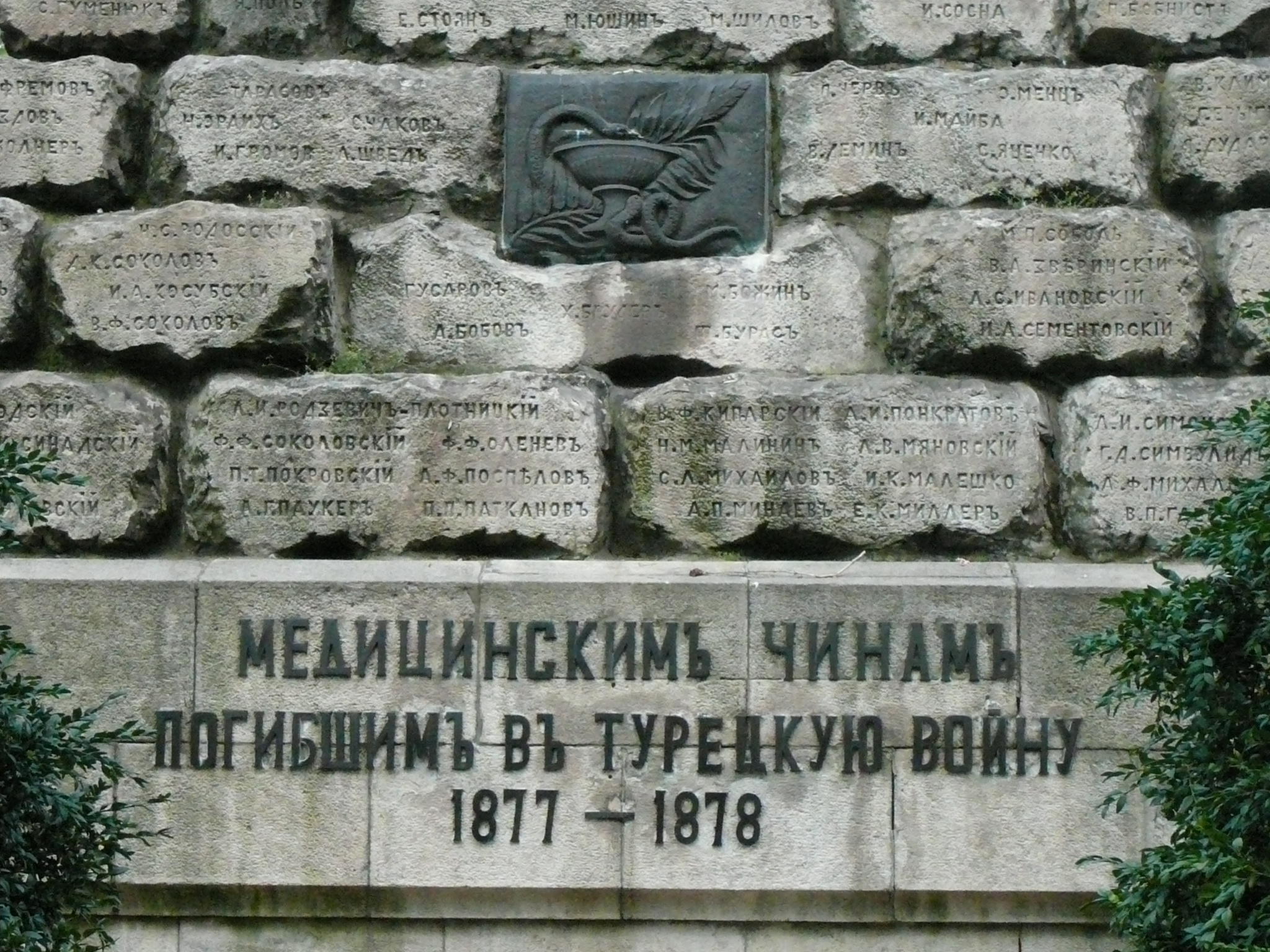

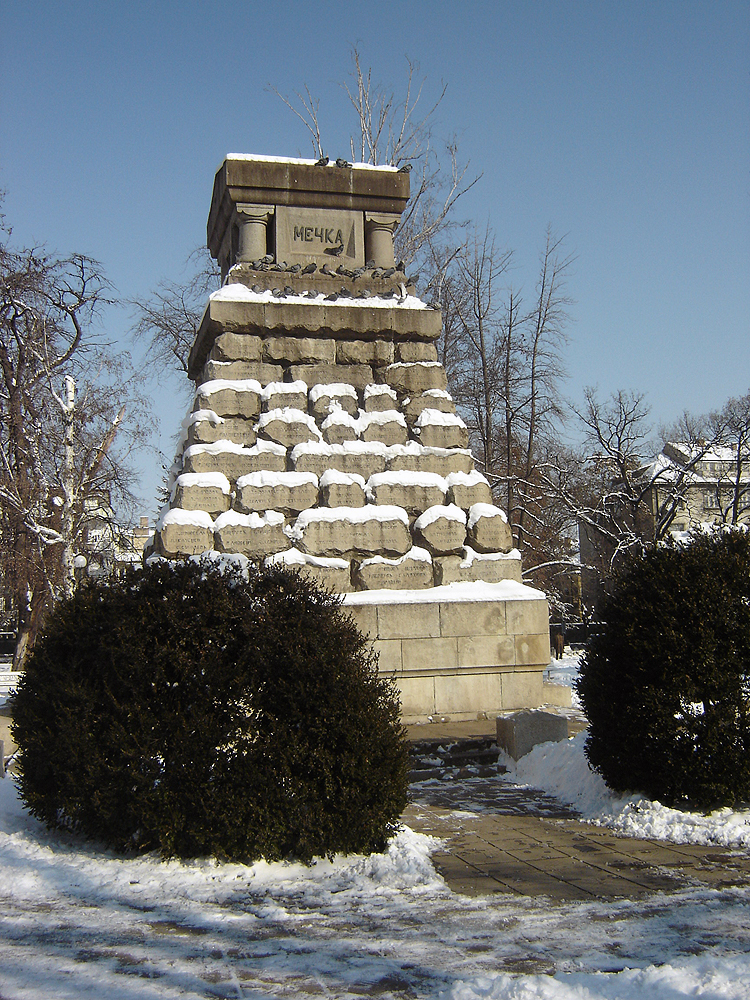

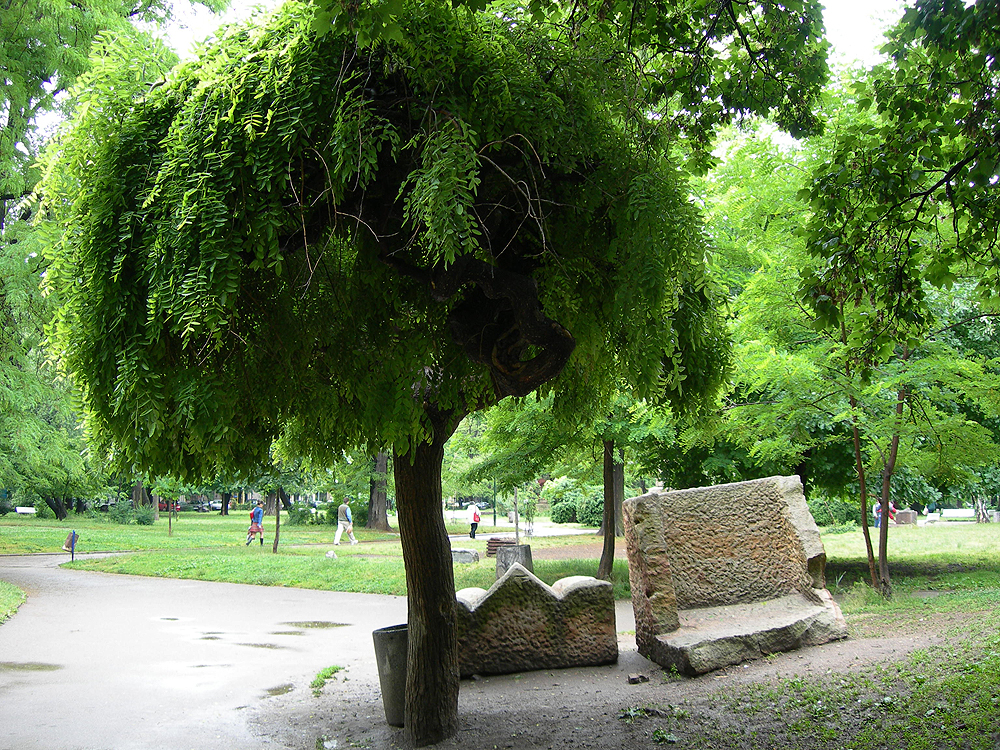
