= Zeleno darvo =

- Village
- Location in Bulgaria
- Coordinates: 42.796°N 25.269°E
- Country: Bulgaria
- Province: Gabrovo Province
- Municipality: Gabrovo
- Time zone: UTC+2 (EET)
  - Summer (DST): UTC+3 (EEST)

Zeleno darvo is a village in Gabrovo Municipality, in Gabrovo Province, in northern central Bulgaria.
