= Vincenzo Tota =

Italian physician (b. 1963)

Vincenzo Tota (born 1963 in Florence, Italy) is a medical doctor specializing in sports medicine. He received his degree in Medicine and Surgery in 1990 from University of Siena, in Siena, Italy. For most of the past two decades, Tota has managed the medical care of numerous race car teams, including fitness training and nutrition for race drivers, in Formula One, off-road and sports car racing. A former off-road and offshore powerboat racer himself, Tota understands the physical toll of sports competition.

Vincenzo Tota furthered his medical career with a specialization in Sport Medicine Traumatology at the Instituto de Clinica Ortopedica in Florence, Italy in 1994. He attended as an orthopaedic doctor at The Hospital in Winchester, England and Mount Sinai Hospital in Toronto, Ontario, Canada in 1991–1993. He also received a Master in Space Medicine Operations through the flight clinic and mission control for Aircraft Medical Operations at Lyndon B. Johnson Space Center (Houston, Texas) and John F. Kennedy Space Center (Cape Canaveral, Florida). He completed his Master in Sports Psychology at Siena University in 1999. He got his Osteopathic Medicine degree at the ICOM university in Milan in 2012.

In addition to his work as a team doctor in sports, he is daily involved in Motorsport Medicine, Vincenzo has also been a teacher at various venues including: Teacher at the Siena Olympic Committee of Sports Medicine and First Aid Techniques for physical trainers; Teacher at both the Gaeta and Formia Military bases in Italy, teaching medicine and psychology applied to drivers of “vedette velocissime” (high velocity patrolling motorboats) used in the fight against clandestine immigration; and Teacher to MDs and PhDs in Master in Sports Psychology at Siena University.

As a racer, Vincenzo won the prestigious Camel Trophy Madagascar in 1987 in a Range Rover and competed in numerous off-road championship series. Additionally, he competed and won the European Offshore Championship in 1999, having been victorious in all races, and three World Endurance Offshore Championships in 2000-2002 as the World-European-Italian Champion. In 2016 he set the world speed record from Monaco (MC) to Venice (IT) in a single leg with the time of 32h46min in the up to 9 meters class powerboat.

Tota speaks his native Italian, and is fluent in English, as well as having a basic knowledge of Spanish and French. The doctor has won several awards including the Gold medal of “Concistoro del Mangia” Siena and Premio “Città di Siena”, both in 1987, and became a Paul Harris Fellow of Rotary International in 1988. He resides in London, UK, and travels worldwide.
