= Land Rover G4 Challenge =

Global competition

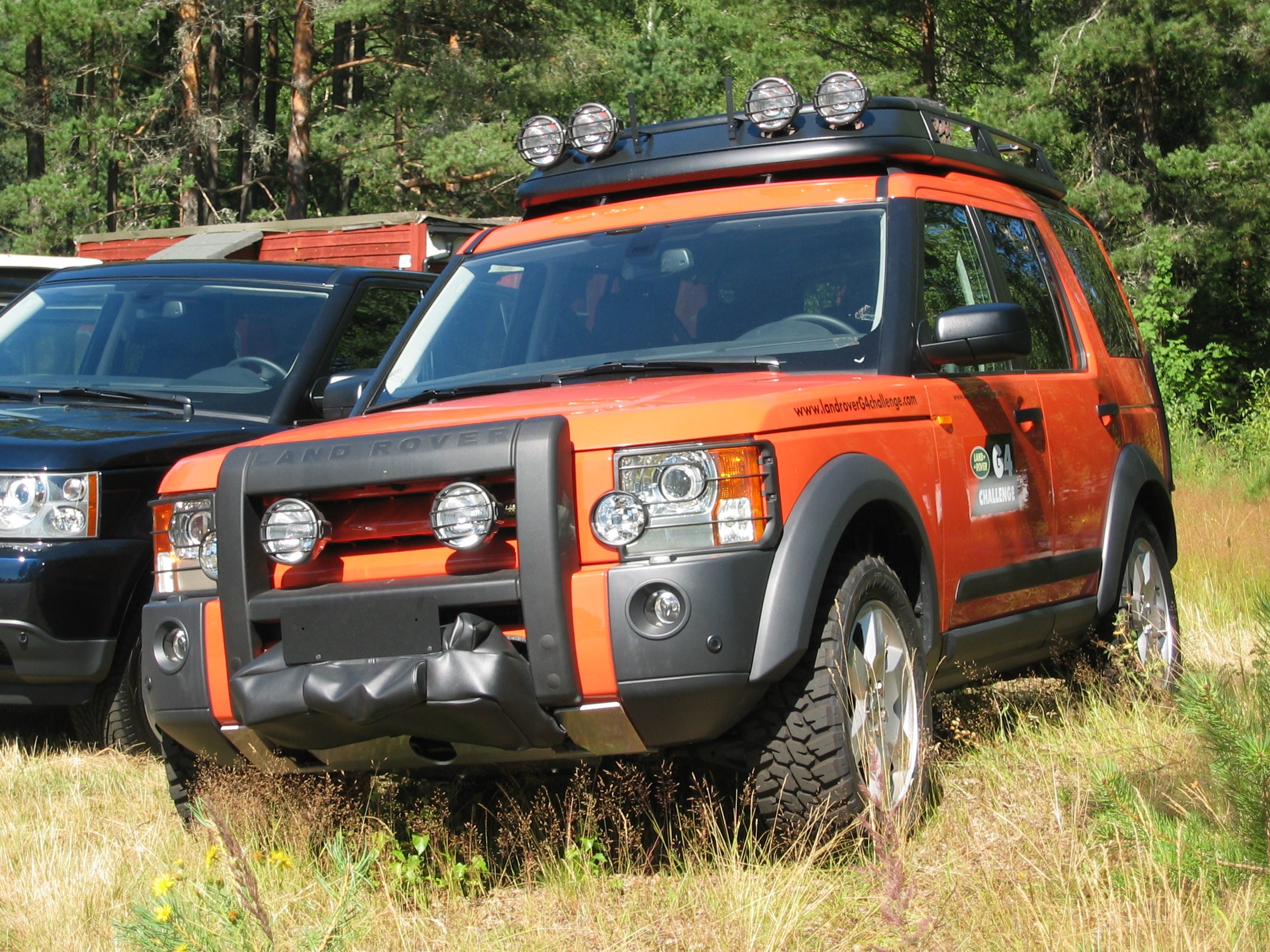
2005 Land Rover Discovery G4 edition

The Land Rover G4 Challenge is a global adventure competition, and as the successor to the Camel Trophy it has off-road driving at its core. As of the cancelled 2008/2009 event, the G4 Challenge was to be run in support of the International Federation of Red Cross and Red Crescent Societies.

Land Rover announced the cancellation of the G4 Challenge on 18 December 2008 due to the current global financial situation.

== Selection ==
The 18-month programme began with National Selections held within each participating nation, followed by an International Selections event at Eastnor Castle in the UK. Each stage of the Challenge included athletic activities such as mountain biking, kayaking, rock-climbing, abseiling, trail running and rope work as well as off-road driving and mental aptitude challenges.

== 2003 G4 Challenge and launch ==
In 2003, the first Land Rover G4 Challenge launched with 16 participating nations and traversed the US, South Africa, and Australia over the course of 28 days. The 2003 Challenge was won by Belgian fighter pilot Rudi Thoelen. Rudi declined the prize of a brand new Range Rover, opting instead for two new Defenders. The Team Spirit Award was won by Tim Pickering from the UK, this award was given by the other competitors for the person who in their view contributed most to the race.

== 2006 G4 Challenge ==
18 nations participated in the 2006 G4 Challenge which was staged across Thailand, Laos, Brazil and Bolivia. Land Rover delivered a more vehicle-focused event in 2006 after some criticism that the 2003 event focused too strongly on the adventure-sports element. South African adventure racer Martin Dreyer was the eventual winner of the 2006 event. Dreyer recalled:

"The Land Rover G4 Challenge was the best experience of my life. I mean, nothing has come close to it in terms of the enormity of it. The experience was out of this world".

The Team Spirit Award was again won by the UK competitor Brian Reynolds, who said:

"I’m a little surprised to have won that, I think it’s because I had a lot of bad luck but was able to keep a positive attitude throughout."

== Commitment to the Red Cross ==
In 2007, the Land Rover G4 Challenge announced a partnership with the International Federation of Red Cross and Red Crescent Societies, which would have seen the programme aim to generate more than £1 million over the course of the next two Challenges.

== 2008/9 G4 Challenge and cancellation of the G4 Challenge ==
The 2008/9 Challenge was intended to be staged in Mongolia with selections events in 2008 and 2009 and the main event later in 2009. the event was billed as: "a thrilling three-week off-road driving and multi sport adventure in the wilds of Asia". 18 countries would have competed. However Land Rover announced the cancellation of the event on 18 December 2008 due to the current global financial situation. It is currently unclear if there will be future events.

"Given the severity of the global economic downturn and trading conditions, we need to make some tough decisions and that means prioritising our budgets on new product launches. We are disappointed for the competitors who have shown so much commitment and put tremendous effort into succeeding as representatives of their nation. We have and will continue to take swift and decisive actions for the benefit of the business; unfortunately that means the Land Rover G4 Challenge has to come to an early close." Phil Popham, Land Rover Managing Director

The 2008/9 G4 Challenge event intended to focus in particular on strengthening Land Rover's links with the International Federation of Red Cross and Red Crescent Societies. The next two G4 Challenge Events aimed to raise over £1 million for the charity. Despite the cancellation of the G4 Challenge both Land Rover and the Red Cross intend to continue their partnership:

"This relationship is something Land Rover highly values and we are proud that it helps to save lives. We will continue to build on the incredibly successful partnership we have with the International Federation and the funds generated to date prove this success" Phil Popham, Land Rover Managing Director

"The International Federation's partnership with the Land Rover G4 Challenge has already had a substantial impact on the lives of vulnerable people in many countries and we are well ahead of the targets we set. We highly value the support we have received and look forward to strengthening relationships between Land Rover and national Red Cross Red Crescent Societies around the world." Paul Jenkins, on behalf of the International Federation of Red Cross and Red Crescent Societies

The 2009 G4 Challenge would have seen the introduction of several revisions to the previous Challenge composition. Land Rover announced a slight change to the team dynamics for the 2008/9 Challenge, there would be one male and one female competitor from each country competing as a team with their own team Land Rover against other participating countries. In the previous Challenges there had been one competitor per country, male or female and countries were not allocated their own Land Rover. Instead the entire range of Land Rovers – Range Rover, Freelander, Discovery, and Defender were driven by each competitor over the course of the event in individual vehicle based challenges which supplemented the adventure sports element.

The 2009 event was also highly anticipated by Land Rover enthusiasts because it intended to return to a more vehicle based event, with a stronger focus on the competitive off-road driving element in the vein of the Camel Trophy, rather than the multiple adventure sports which the previous Challenges had emphasized.

At the point the 2008/9 Challenge was cancelled selectors had narrowed the UK qualifiers down to a final four: Sarah Davies, Bruce Duncan, Maria Leijerstam and Andy Grieve. They would have represented the UK in the February 2009 International qualifier competing against the top four qualifiers from the other 17 competing nations. The four representatives from each country would have been reduced to two after the International qualifier, judged on their performance this final selection. The final two representatives from each country (one male and one female) would have gone on to represent their country in the Challenge proper in Mongolia, in June 2009.

"I don’t know any other event where you are doing all these sorts of things. You get so many different great fun things to do. That’s why I loved the Challenge so much. It was the perfect competition." Alina McMaster, Australian competitor 2006.

== Prize ==
In the 2003 and 2006, the prize for the winning competitor was a brand new Range Rover. However, this was intended to be altered for the 2009 event, the prize for the winning team would have been the donation of a Land Rover to their nation's Red Cross or Red Crescent Society.

== Vehicles used ==
In 2003:

Vehicles used	Number prepared	Stages used By competitors
Defender	31 (29 used on main challenge)	Stage 2: South Africa
Range Rover	30 (28 used on main challenge)	Stage 3: Australia
Discovery 2	62 (60 used on main challenge)	Stage 4: USA (Las Vegas & Moab Desert)
Freelander I	30 (28 used on main challenge)	Stage 1: USA (New York)

In 2006:

Vehicles used	Engine	Number prepared	Stages used By competitors
Defender	Td5 Diesel 110 CSW	31 (29 used on main challenge)	None – Support Vehicle Only
Range Rover	4.4 V8 Petrol Vogue	24 (19 used on main challenge)	None – Support Vehicle Only
Discovery 3 (LR3)	4.4 V8 Petrol HSE	39 (38 used on main challenge)	Stages 3&4: Bolivia
Freelander I	2.5 V6 Petrol SE	15 (14 used on main challenge)	Stage 3: Brazil
Range Rover Sport	4.4 V8 Petrol HSE	35 (34 used on main challenge)	Stages 1&2: Thailand

In 2009:

Although the 2009 Challenge was cancelled, a few vehicles were prepared and used as pre-event recce vehicles. The 2009 vehicles were decked out similarly to previously Challenge vehicles with the distinctive Tangiers Orange paintwork, but with new body decals emphasizing the G4 Challenge's new association with the Red Cross. At least two Defenders, two Discovery 3s (LR3s), two Freelander 2s (LR2), and one Range Rover were produced for the Recce in Mongolia in 2008 before the main 2009 event; For the actual G4 Challenge in 2009, the following were vehicles were prepared: six (6) Defender 110's, five (5) Defender 130's, Sixty Eight (68) Discovery 3s (LR3s), seven (7) Freelander 2s (LR2), and two (2) Range Rovers, eight (8) Range Rover Sports were produced. Visitors to the Solihull factory in the autumn of 2008 spotted a number of Tangiers Orange vehicles in the production stores.

== See also ==
- Camel Trophy
- Land Rover
