= Josephine Tota =

Italian-American artist (1910-1966)

Josephine Tota (August 11, 1910 – December 29, 1996) was an Italian-born American painter known for her surrealist paintings featuring egg tempera on wood panels.

Tota was born in Corato, Italy on August 11, 1910. She emigrated with her family to Rochester, New York in 1920. She left school in seventh grade to get a job to make money for her family. In 1929 she married her cousin, Frank Tota. In 1930 they moved to the Bronx where Tota suffered miscarriages and became depressed. The couple moved back to Rochester where they had their first child Rosamond (b.1940).

Tota became a seamstress and worked in the Tailor Shop at the National Clothing Company where she repaired clothes until she retired in 1967. In 1967 her mother and husband died, and she and her sister were diagnosed with cancer. She suffered from depression again and was hospitalized to receive shock therapy. In the 1990s Tota developed dementia and died on December 29, 1996, from complications from vascular dementia.

During her time as a seamstress and continuing after her retirement, Tota took art classes in painting and sculpture. Most of her painting was done inside her home. In the 1980s, when she was in her seventies, she began working with tempera. In 1990 she had her first exhibition at the Lucy Burne Gallery of the Creative Workshop of the Memorial Art Gallery when she was 80. The exhibition included 20 of her paintings and other ceramics and masks. Tota's work illustrates her interest in art history, medieval and modern art, and the personal tragedies she experienced in her life. After her death, The Memorial Art Gallery featured the exhibition The Surreal Visions of Josephine Tota, which included 90 paintings and a small number of ceramics and textiles.
