= Range Rover =

Series of SUV models

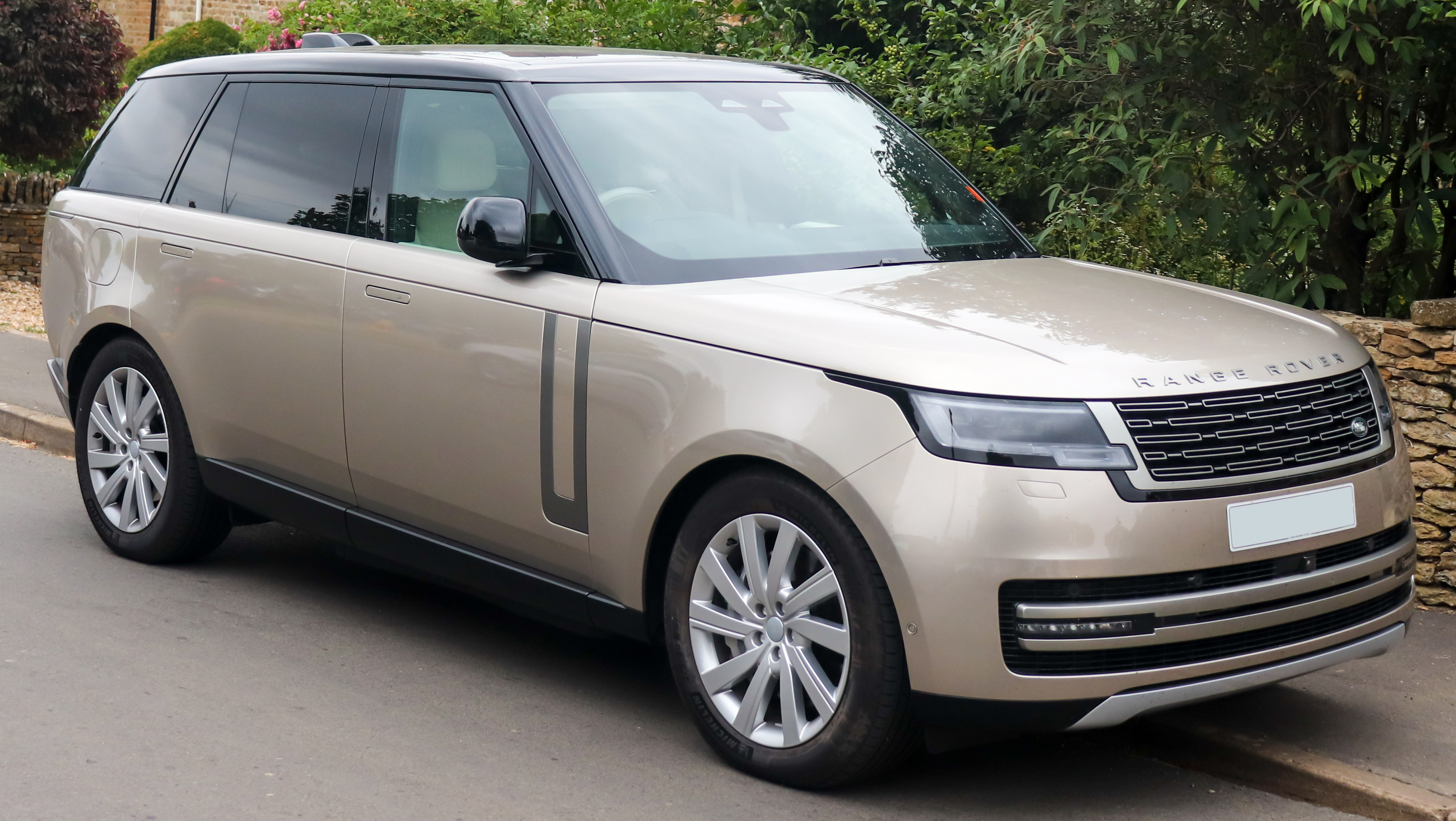
- 2022 Range Rover SE P440e (L460, UK)

Overview
- Manufacturer: British Leyland (1970–1978); Land Rover Ltd. (1978–2012); Jaguar Land Rover (2013–present)
- Also called: Range Rover Vogue (1981–2022); Range Rover Autobiography (1994–present)
- Production: 1969–present
- Assembly: United Kingdom: Solihull (Solihull plant); Venezuela: Las Tejerías (Tracto Agro: 1973–1981); Australia: Enfield (BMC Australia: 1979–1983); India: Pune (JLR India: 2024–present)

Body and chassis
- Class: Mid-size luxury 4×4; Full-size luxury 4×4 (LWB models)
- Layout: Front-engine, four-wheel-drive
- Chassis: Body-on-frame (1970–2001); Unibody (2001–present)

Range Rover is a 4×4 luxury marque and sub-brand of Jaguar Land Rover. The Range Rover line was launched in 1970 by British Leyland and since 2022 is in its fifth generation.

Additional models have been launched under the Range Rover name, including the Range Rover Sport, Range Rover Evoque, Range Rover Velar and Range Rover GT.

== Prototypes ==
The Rover Company (originator of the Land Rover marque) was experimenting with a larger model than the Land Rover Series in 1951, when the Rover P4-based two-wheel-drive "Road Rover" project was developed by Gordon Bashford. This was shelved in 1958 and the idea lay dormant until 1966, when engineers Spen King and Bashford set to work on a new model.

Road Rover prototypes
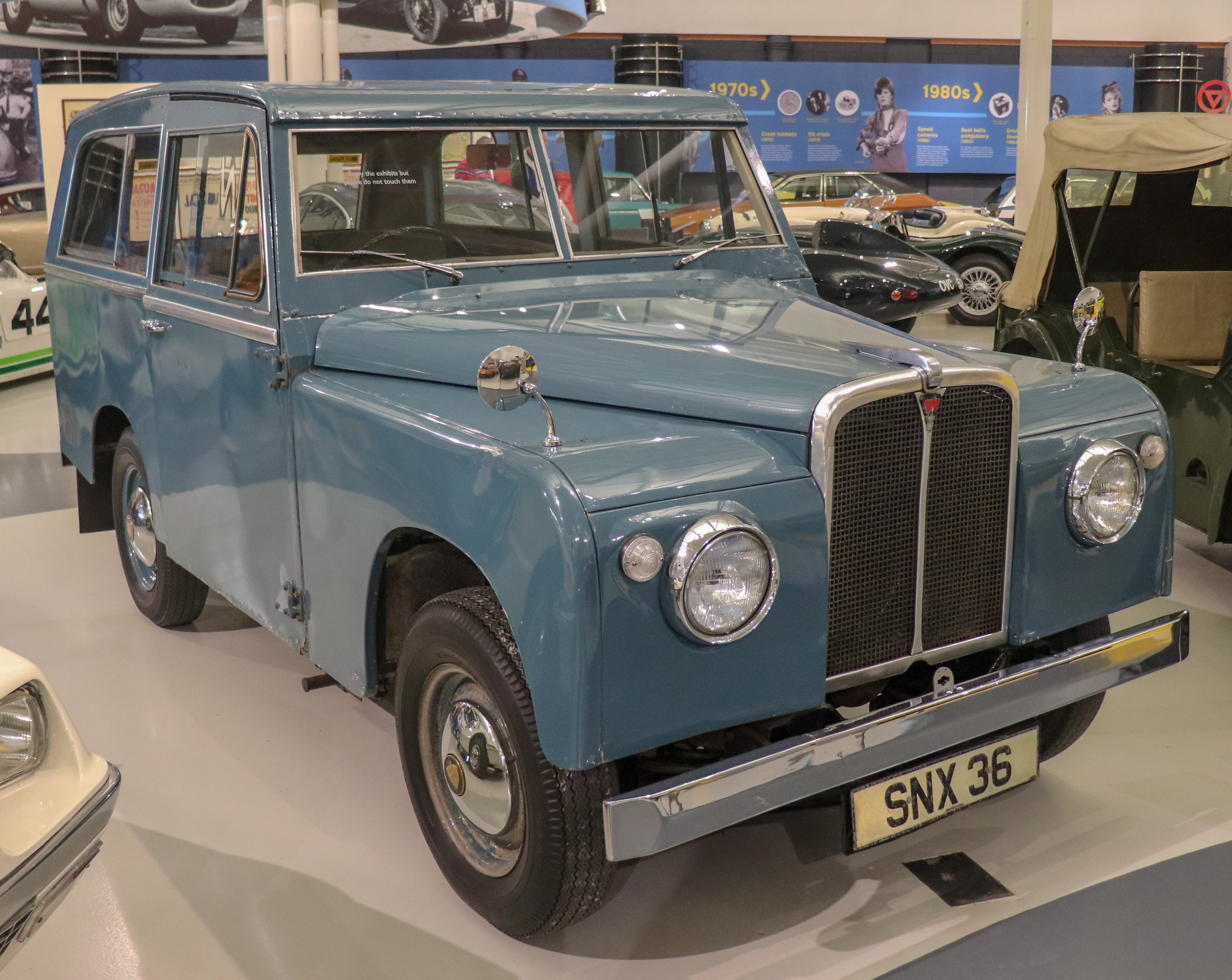
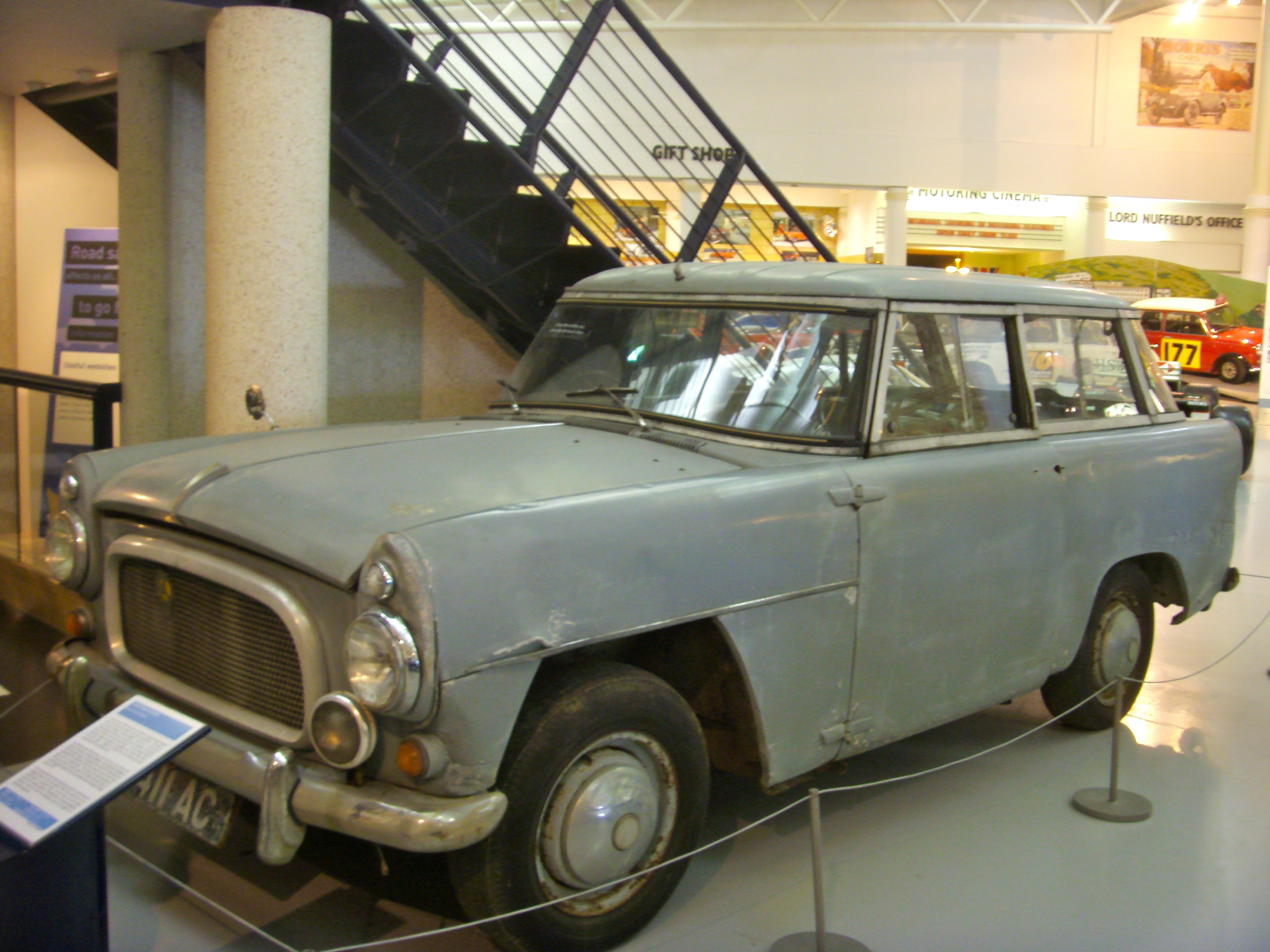
Surviving Road Rover Series I and II prototypes from 1955 and 1958 at the British Motor Museum

The first Range Rover prototype was built in 1967 with plate number SYE 157F. The design of the Range Rover was finalised in 1969. Twenty-six Velar-badged engineering development vehicles were built between 1969 and 1970 and were road registered with the number plates YVB151H through to YVB177H.

Though being chassis no. 3, YVB 153H is believed to have been the first off the production line as a vehicle in that colour was urgently required for marketing. (The Range Rover with chassis no. 1 was a green model with the registration "YVB 151H", and is now on exhibition at Huddersfield Land Rover Centre, Huddersfield, West Yorkshire). The Velar name was derived from the Italian "velare" meaning to veil or to cover. Range Rover development engineer Geof Miller used the name as a decoy for registering pre-production Range Rovers. The Velar company was registered in London and produced 40 pre-production vehicles that were built between 1967 and 1970. Conveniently the badging could be made up utilising existing letters from the words "Land Rover".

The Range Rover was launched in 1970. In the early 1970s, the Musée du Louvre in Paris exhibited a Range Rover as an "exemplary work of industrial design".

In 1971, ex-Cream drummer Ginger Baker used the unproven Range Rover to drive from Algeria to Lagos, Nigeria, to set up a recording studio and jam with Fela Kuti. Predating the Paris-Dakar rally the subsequent documentary is replete with such terrain, documenting the vehicle's endurance.

In 1972, the British Trans-Americas Expedition became the first vehicle-based expedition to traverse the Americas from north to south, including traversing the roadless Darién Gap. The specially modified Range Rovers used for this expedition are now on display in the British Motor Industry Heritage Trust collection at Gaydon, Warwickshire.

Range Rover sub-brands have been launched. In 2004, Land Rover debuted the Range Rover Sport, based on the Land Rover Discovery platform. Later models received the latest Range Rover platform. In 2011 came the Range Rover Evoque, and in 2017 the Range Rover Velar (re-using the name of the very first, pre-production Range Rovers).

== In North America ==
From 1970 until 1987, the Range Rover was only available to American consumers through unofficial grey market import channels. Its popularity via these imports prompted official U.S. sales to begin on 16 March 1987. From that time until 1993, the U.S. marketing was all in the name of Range Rover, because it was the only model offered in the American market. In 1993, with the arrival of the Defender 110 and the imminent arrival of the Land Rover Discovery, the company's U.S. sales were under the name "Land Rover North America".

== First generation (1970) ==
Range Rover "Classic"
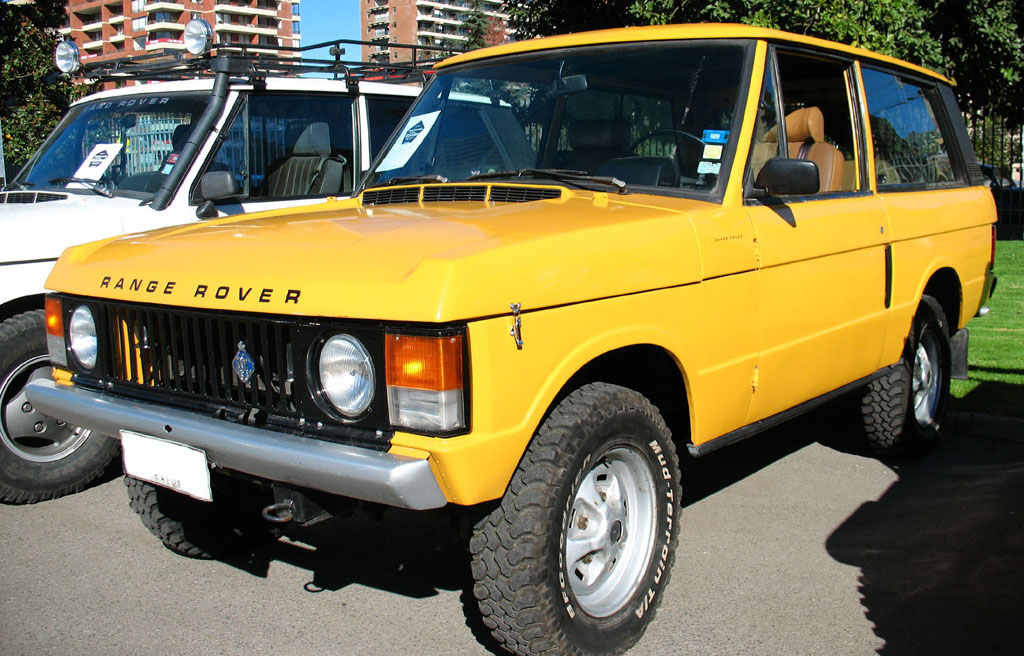
- Original, 3-door Range Rover (1979)

Overview
- Production: 1969–1996
- Assembly: United Kingdom: Solihull (Solihull plant); Australia: Enfield

Body and chassis
- Body style: 3/5-door 4x4
- Chassis: body-on-frame
- Related: Land Rover Discovery

Dimensions
- Wheelbase: 100.0 in (2,540 mm) (standard); 108.0 in (2,743 mm) (Vogue LSE)
- Length: 175 in (4,445 mm) (SWB); 183 in (4,648 mm) (LWB)
- Width: 70.1 in (1,781 mm)
- Height: 70.1–70.9 in (1,781–1,801 mm)

The first-generation Range Rover was produced between 1970 and 1996. It was available only in a 2-door body until 1981. (Before then, 4-door models had been produced by specialist firms).

Unlike other 4x4s such as the Jeep Wagoneer, the original Range Rover was not designed as a luxury vehicle. It was up-market compared to preceding Land Rover models, but the early Range Rovers had fairly basic, utilitarian, interiors with vinyl seats and plastic dashboards that were designed to be washed down with a hose. Convenience features such as power steering, carpeted floors, air conditioning, cloth/leather seats, and wooden interior trim were fitted later.

The Range Rover was a body-on-frame design with a box section ladder type chassis, like the contemporary Series Land Rovers. The Range Rover used coil springs as opposed to leaf springs, permanent four-wheel drive, and four-wheel disc brakes. The Range Rover was originally powered by various Rover V8 engines and diesel engines.

Originally, the Range Rover was fitted with a detuned 127 hp (95 kW) version of the Buick-derived Rover V8 engine. In 1984, the engine was fitted with Lucas fuel injection, boosting power to 155 hp (116 kW). The 3.5-litre (3,528 cc) engine was bored out to a displacement of 3.9 litres (3,947 cc) for the 1990 model year, and 4.2 litres (4,215 cc) in 1992 for the 108-inch Long Wheelbase Vogue LSE (County LWB in North America). One of the first significant changes came in 1981, with the introduction of a four-door body. In 1988, LR introduced a 2.4-litre turbodiesel (badged Vogue Turbo D) with 112 bhp (84 kW), manufactured by Italian VM Motori. The diesel project was codenamed project Beaver. In 1990 project Otter was unveiled, a mildly tuned 2.5-litre, 119 bhp (89 kW) version of the 'Beaver' 2.4. In 1992, Land Rover finally introduced their own diesel engines in the Range Rover, beginning with the 111 bhp (83 kW) 200TDi, first released in the Land Rover Discovery and following in 1994, the 300 TDi with the same maximum output.

The classic was known as the Range Rover until almost the end of its production when Land Rover introduced the name Range Rover Classic to distinguish it from its successors. The original model served as the basis for the 1989 introduced 1st generation Discovery (directly based on the standard (short) wheelbase Range Rover), and for the second generation Range Rover, based on the LWB chassis of the Classic.

Jaguar-Rover-Australia began assembly of the Range Rover from CKD kits at its Enfield plant, in New South Wales, Australia in 1979. Government increases in the tariff on parts led to the discontinuation of Australian assembly in 1983.

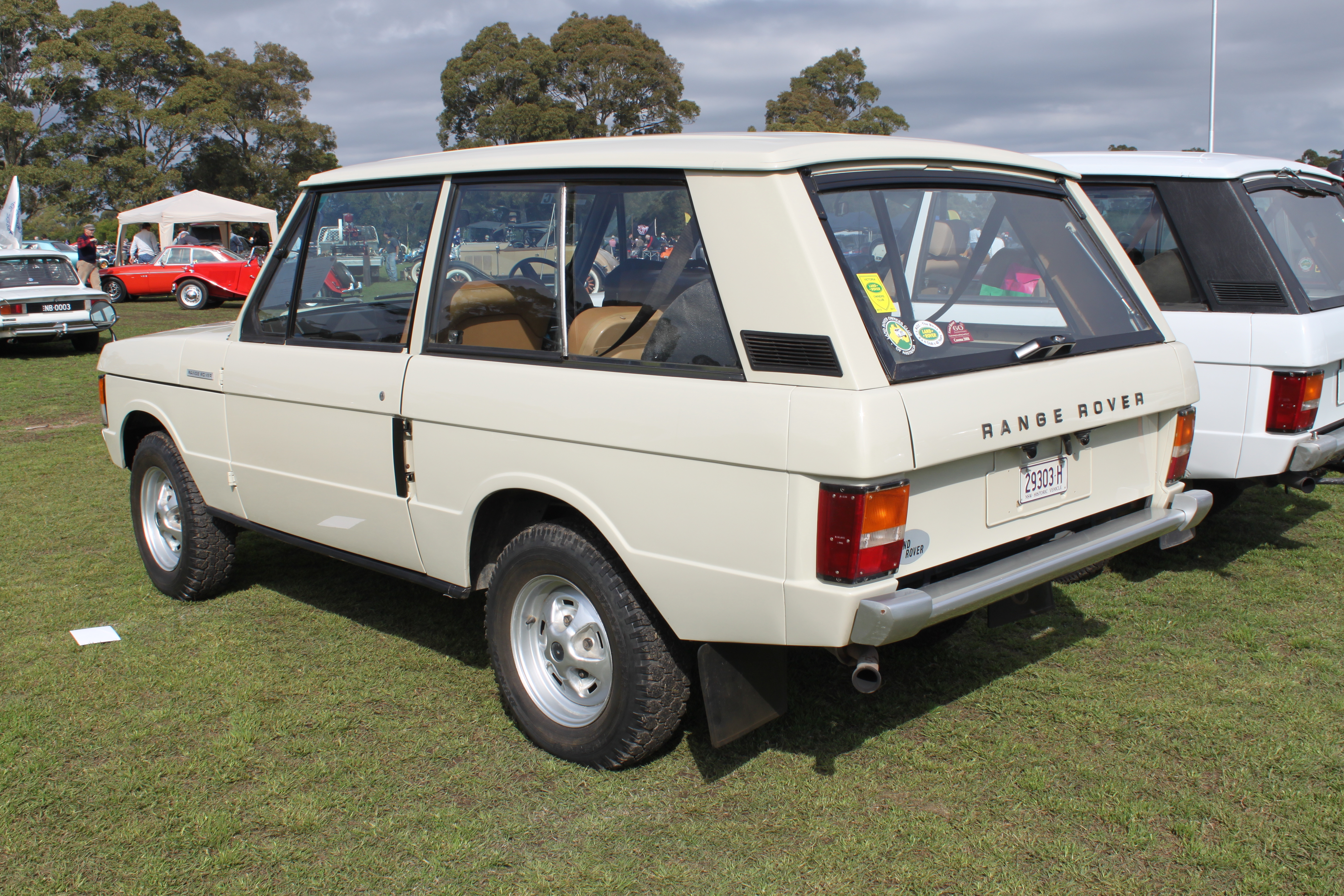
Range Rover 3-door (rear)

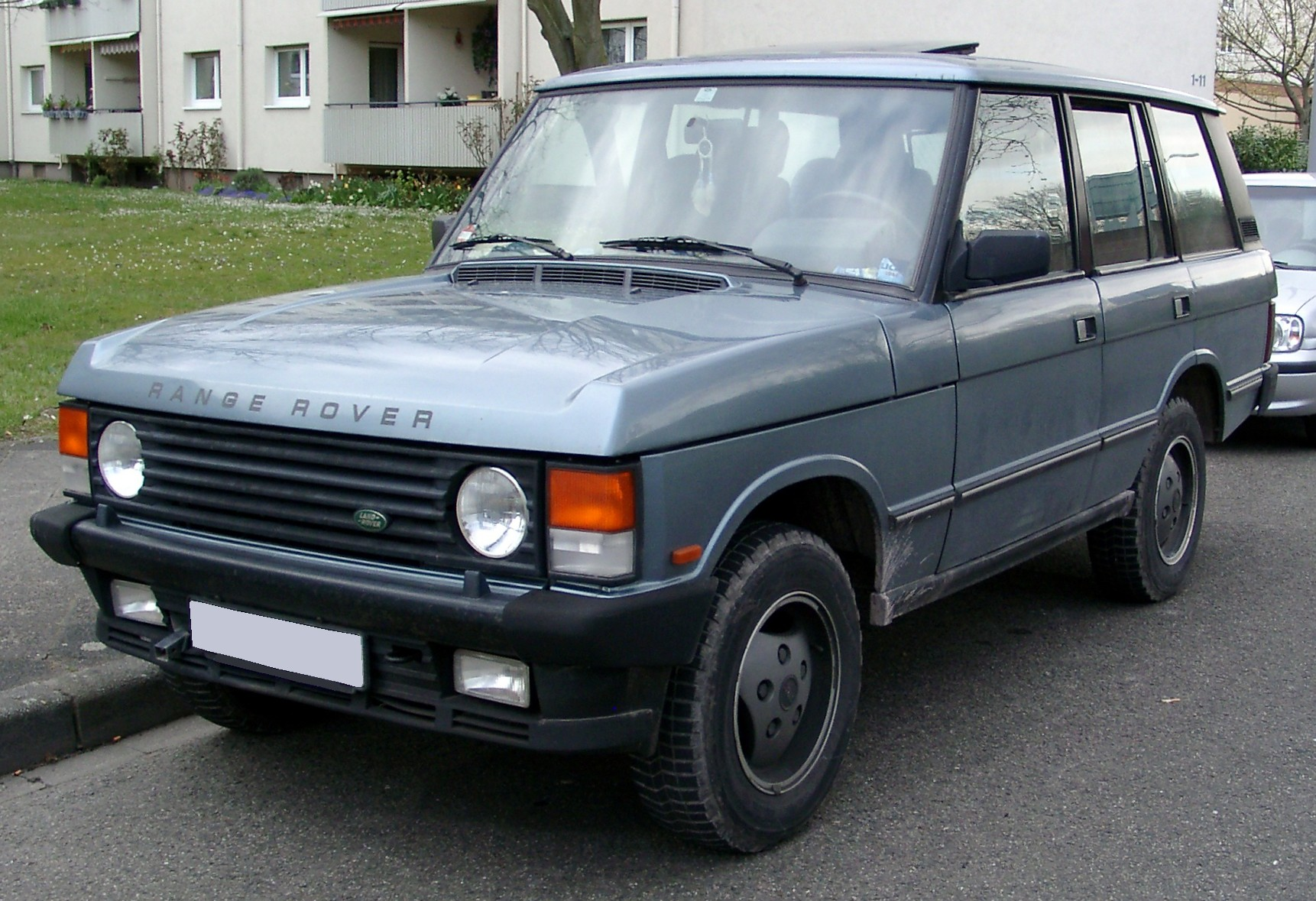
Range Rover 5-door estate

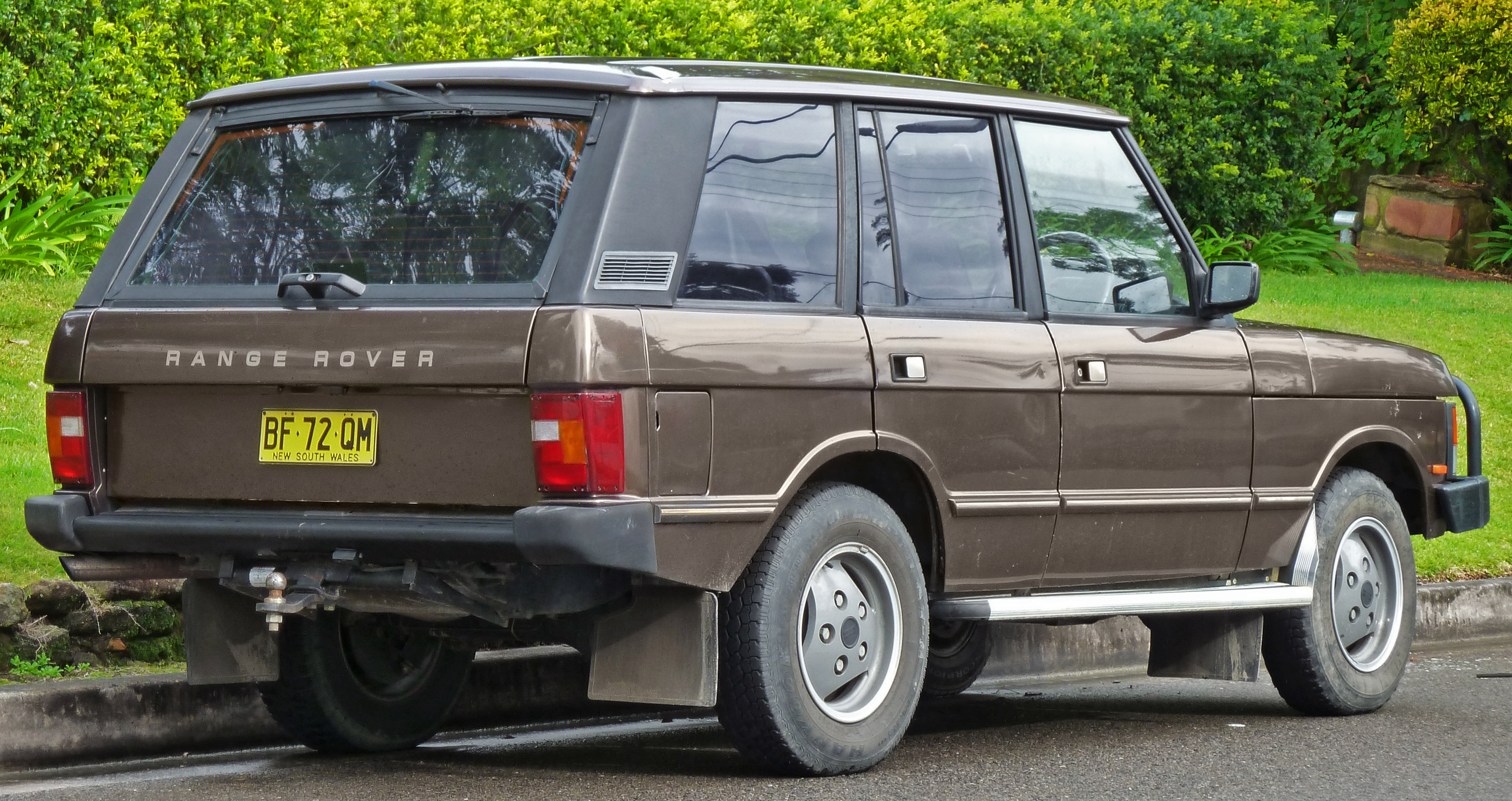
Range Rover 5-door estate (rear)

=== Specialist vehicles ===
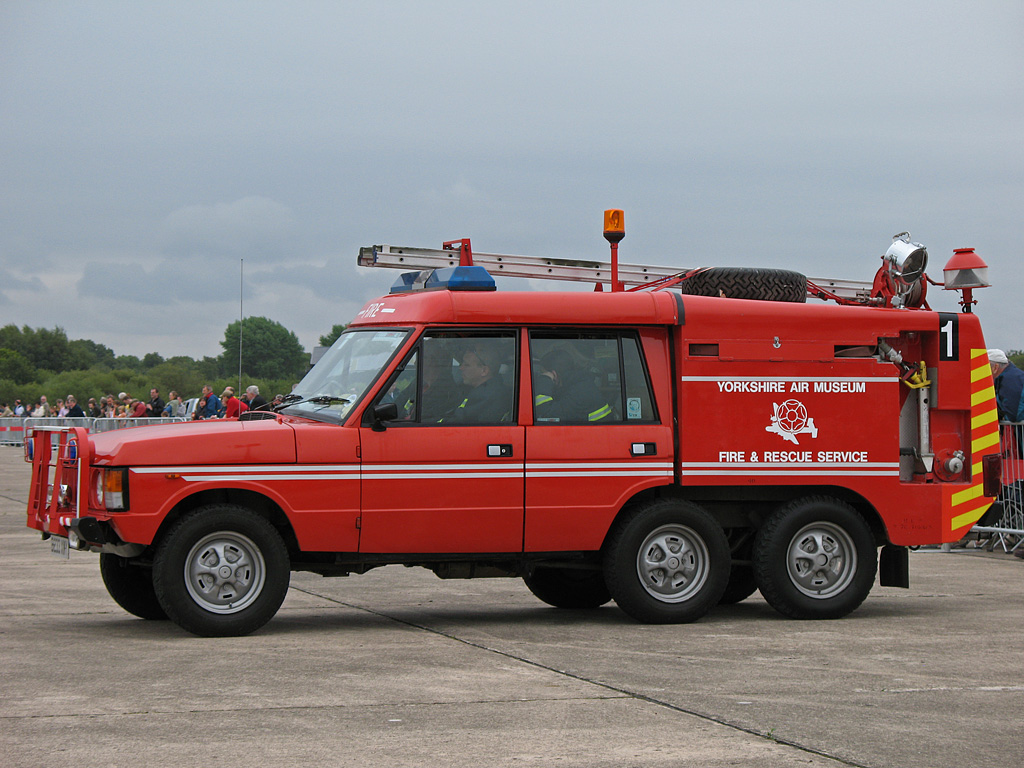
YAM Range Rover Airport Fire Tender

The first-generation Range Rover served as the base for specialist utility vehicles. These included the Carmichaels International six-wheel Fire Tender. This was a two-door model with an extended chassis and a third "lazy" axle added. Designed for small airfield use, it had a water-pump mounted on the front bumper driven directly by the V8's crankshaft. The MoD purchased them for the RAF, this version was called the TACR2. Carmichaels was contracted to supply the modified chassis and the fire-fighting body was supplied and mounted by Gloster-Saro. These were four-door versions using an internally mounted water-pump driven by a gearbox PTO. At least one of these (at Duxford IWM) has been converted into a full 6WD by linking a drive-through unit to the two rear axles

== Second generation (1994) ==
Range Rover (P38A)
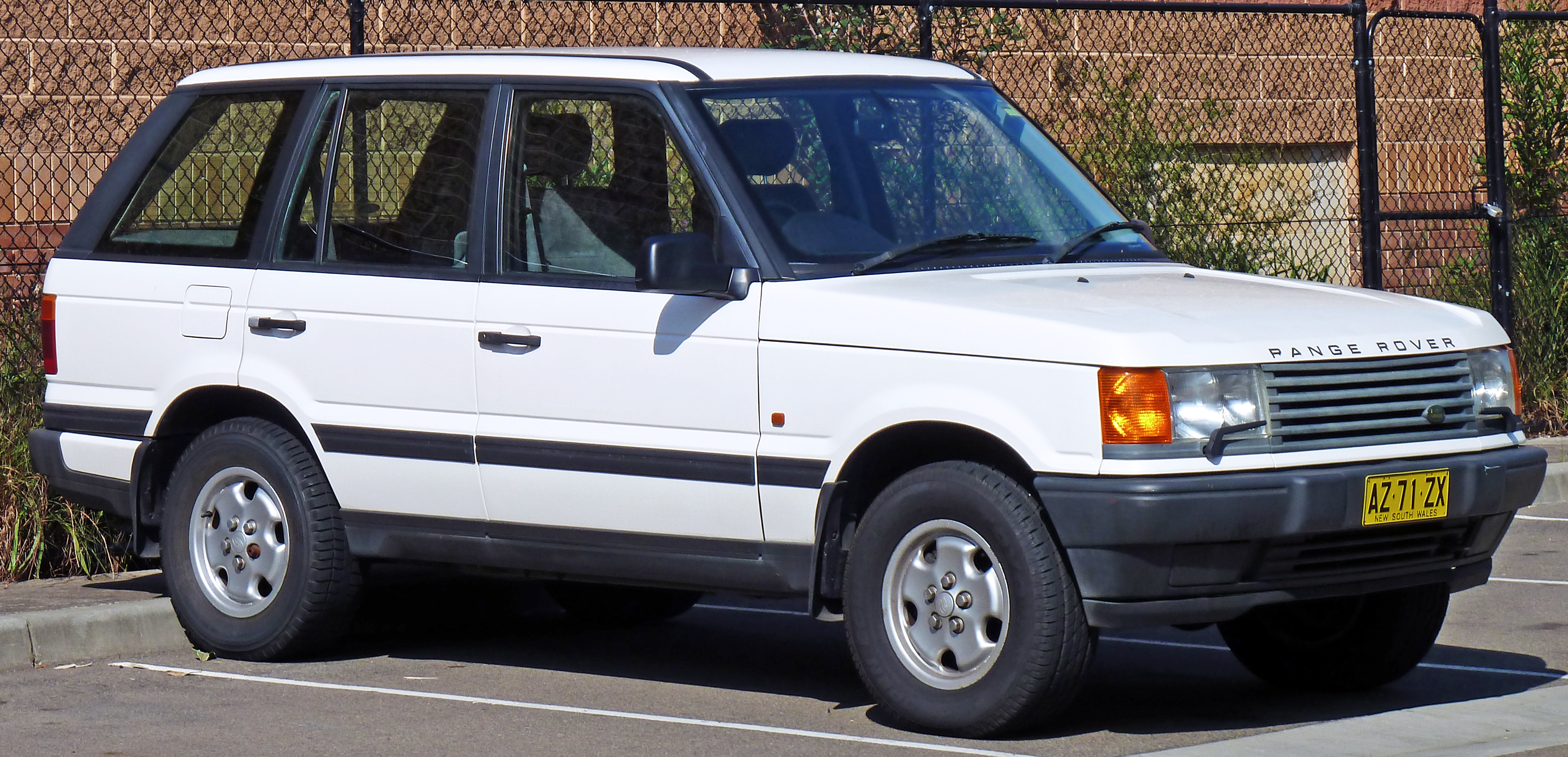

Overview
- Production: 1994–2001
- Model years: 1995–2002

Body and chassis
- Body style: 5-door 4x4

Powertrain
- Engine: Petrol: 4.0 L Rover V8; 4.6 L Rover V8; Diesel: 2.5 L BMW M51 turbodiesel I6
- Transmission: 5-speed manual; 4-speed automatic

Dimensions
- Wheelbase: 108.1 in (2,746 mm)
- Length: 185.5 in (4,712 mm)
- Width: 74.4 in (1,890 mm)
- Height: 71.6 in (1,819 mm)

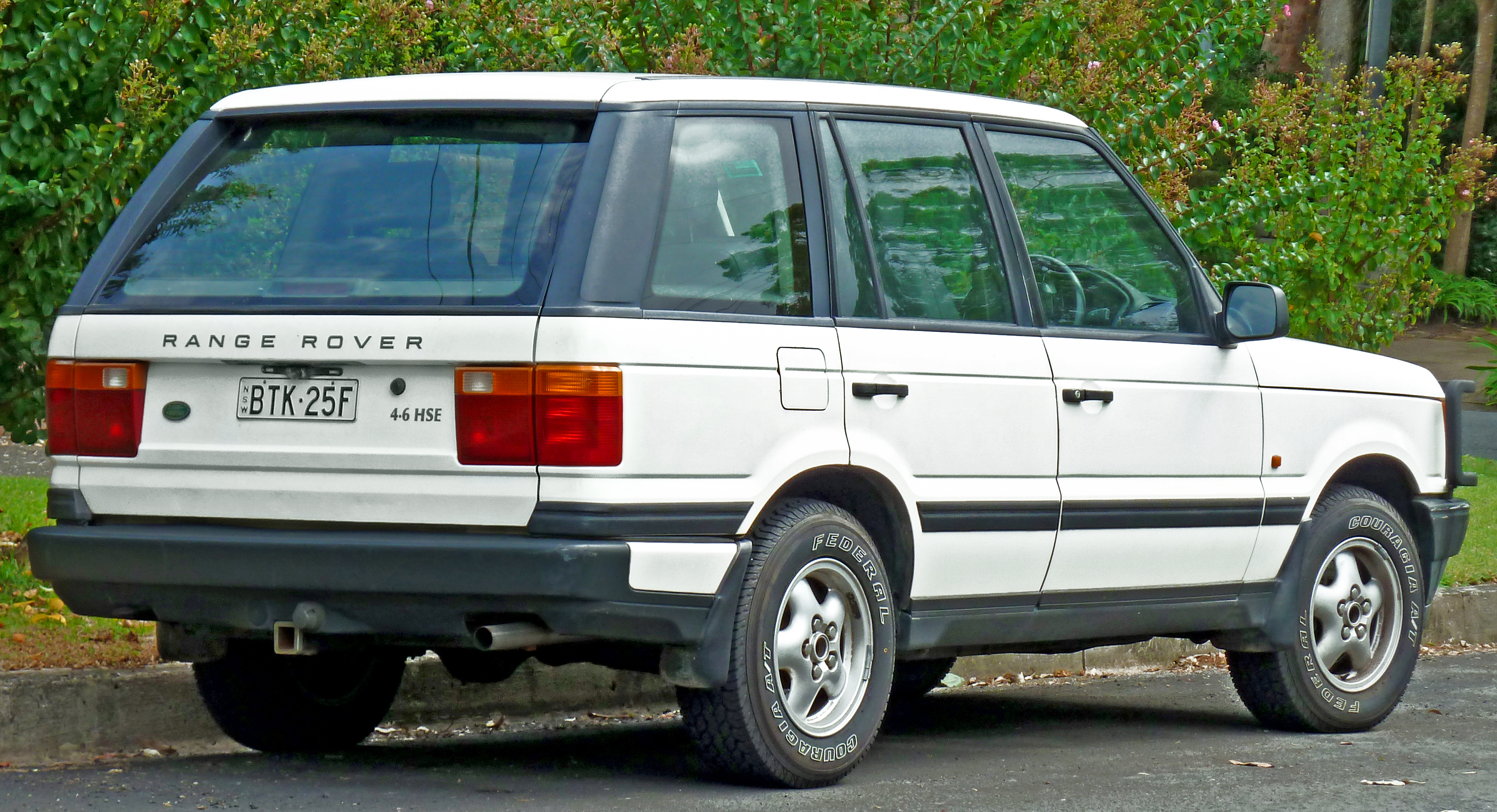
Land Rover Range Rover 4.6 HSE estate (Australia)

Twenty-five years after the introduction of the original Range Rover, the second-generation (model-designation P38A) was introduced for the 1996 model year, based on the LWB chassis of the model, with an updated version of the Rover V8 engine or a 2.5-litre BMW six-cylinder turbo-diesel with a Bosch injection pump. This was the first diesel injection with electronic controls in a Land Rover, before common rails were introduced. This was a result of BMW's subsequent ownership of Rover Group and hence the Land Rover brand.

This model was the last to use the Rover V8 and interior leather supplied by Connolly, who went out of business in 2002. It was the first model to feature Satellite Navigation as an option.

== Third generation (2001) ==
Range Rover (L322)
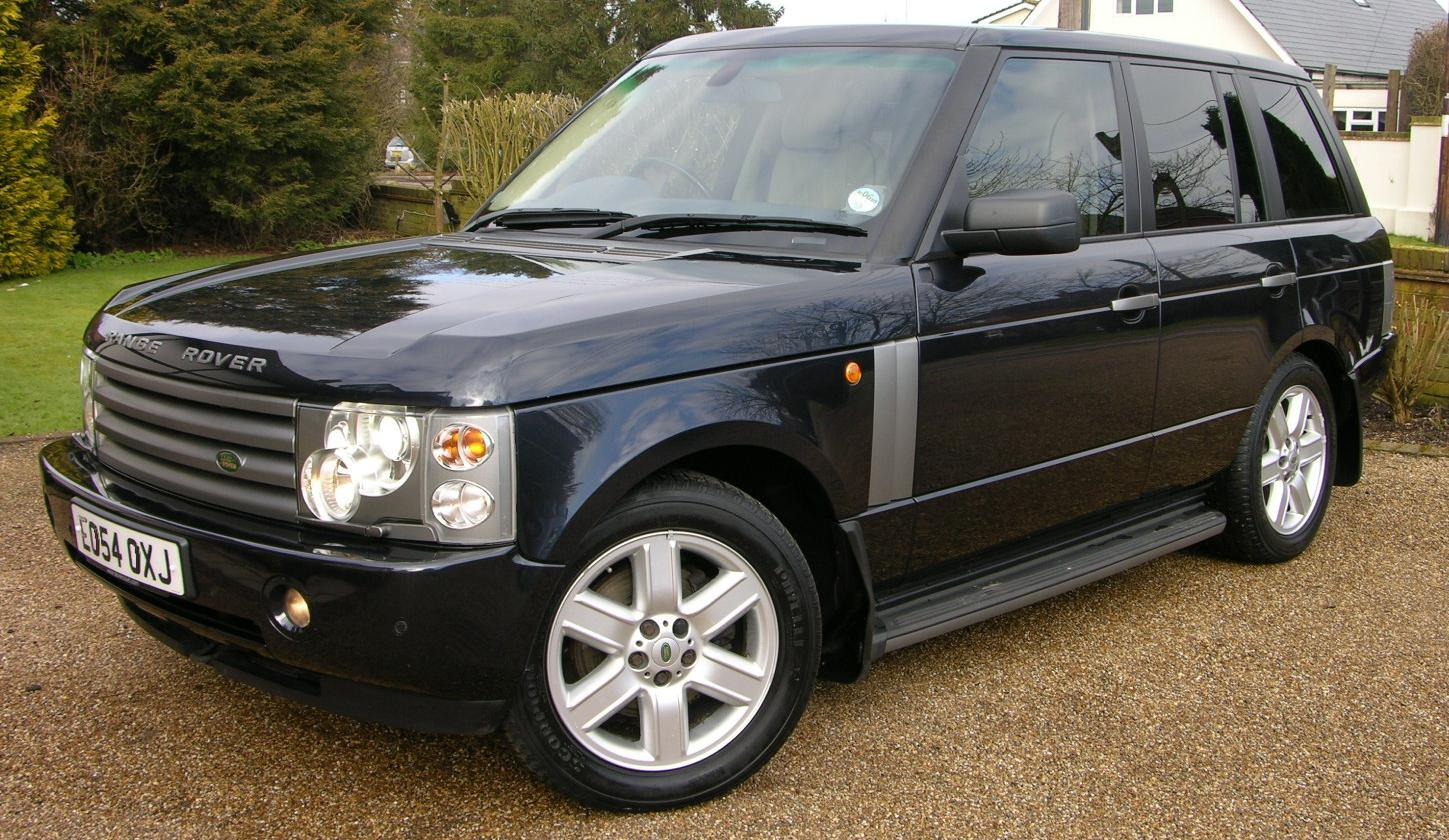

Overview
- Production: 2001–2012

Body and chassis
- Body style: 5-door 4x4

Powertrain
- Transmission: 5-speed automatic (2001–2005); 6-speed automatic (2005–2012); 8-speed ZF 8HP automatic (2010–2012, only non-NAS markets)

Dimensions
- Wheelbase: 113.4 in (2,880 mm)
- Length: 194.9–195.9 in (4,950–4,976 mm)
- Width: 75.7–76.1 in (1,923–1,933 mm)
- Height: 73.3–74.9 in (1,862–1,902 mm)

In 2001, the third-generation model was introduced, which saw the model move further upmarket. Planned and developed under BMW ownership the third generation shared components and systems (electronics, core power units etc.) with the BMW 7 Series (E38). The 7 Series electronics system was being phased out during the development of the third-generation Range Rover and being replaced with the electronics from the BMW 5 Series (E39).

There were three "Generations" of the L322. First, from 2001 until 2005, was the 4.4 litre M62 BMW V8 with ZF 5HP-24 transmission. (The manual transmission was dropped, leaving only the automatic). Then, from 2006 until 2009 a 4.4-litre Jaguar-derived engine or a 4.2-litre supercharged variant of the Jaguar engine partnered with the ZF 6HP-26 transmission. and thirdly, in 2010 Land Rover fitted the newly-designed AJ133 5.0 N/A and Supercharged engine with ZF 6HP-26 until the 2012 model year, the end of L322 production. (This summary does not give diesel options).

From 2001-2004 the L322 used a standard BMW E39 electrics system. From 2005-2009 the L322 saw an updated Jaguar-derived electrical system with fibre optics and Bluetooth. From 2010-2012 the L322 used updated Jaguar-derived electrics, the first "modern feeling" system, replacing the gear lever with a rotary dial.

For the 2006 model year, the first exterior update was applied with a face-lift of the front fascia, lighting, and side vent revisions. The interiors stayed relatively the same until 2006.5, (NAS 2007). The second exterior update was in 2010, bringing another new fascia, tail lamps, side grills, and clear side markers. This revision also brought a major change under the skin: a range of new engines was offered, with 5-litre versions of the petrol V8 in standard and supercharged forms.

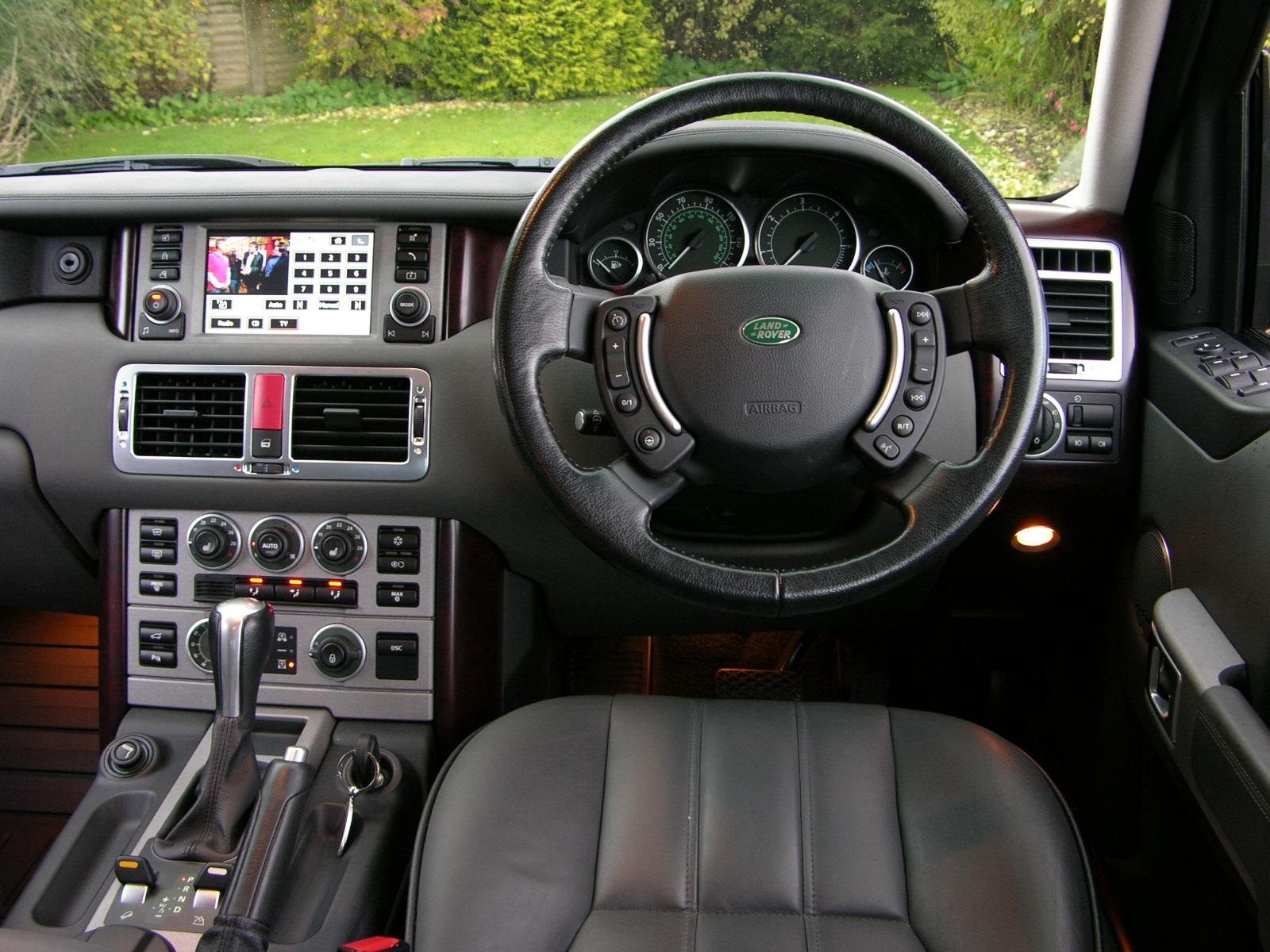
Interior

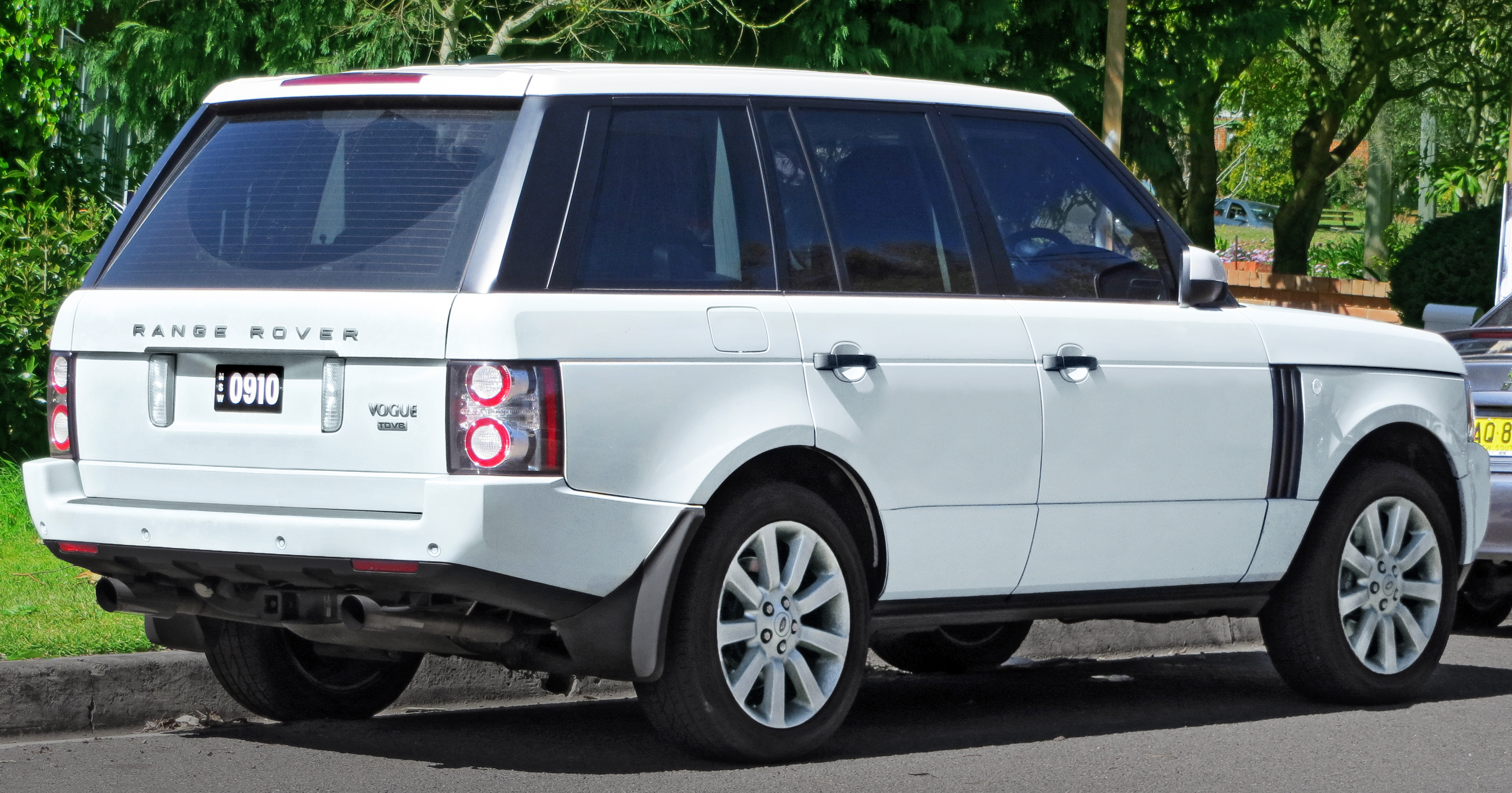
Range Rover Vogue (Australia)

== Fourth generation (2012) ==
Range Rover (L405)
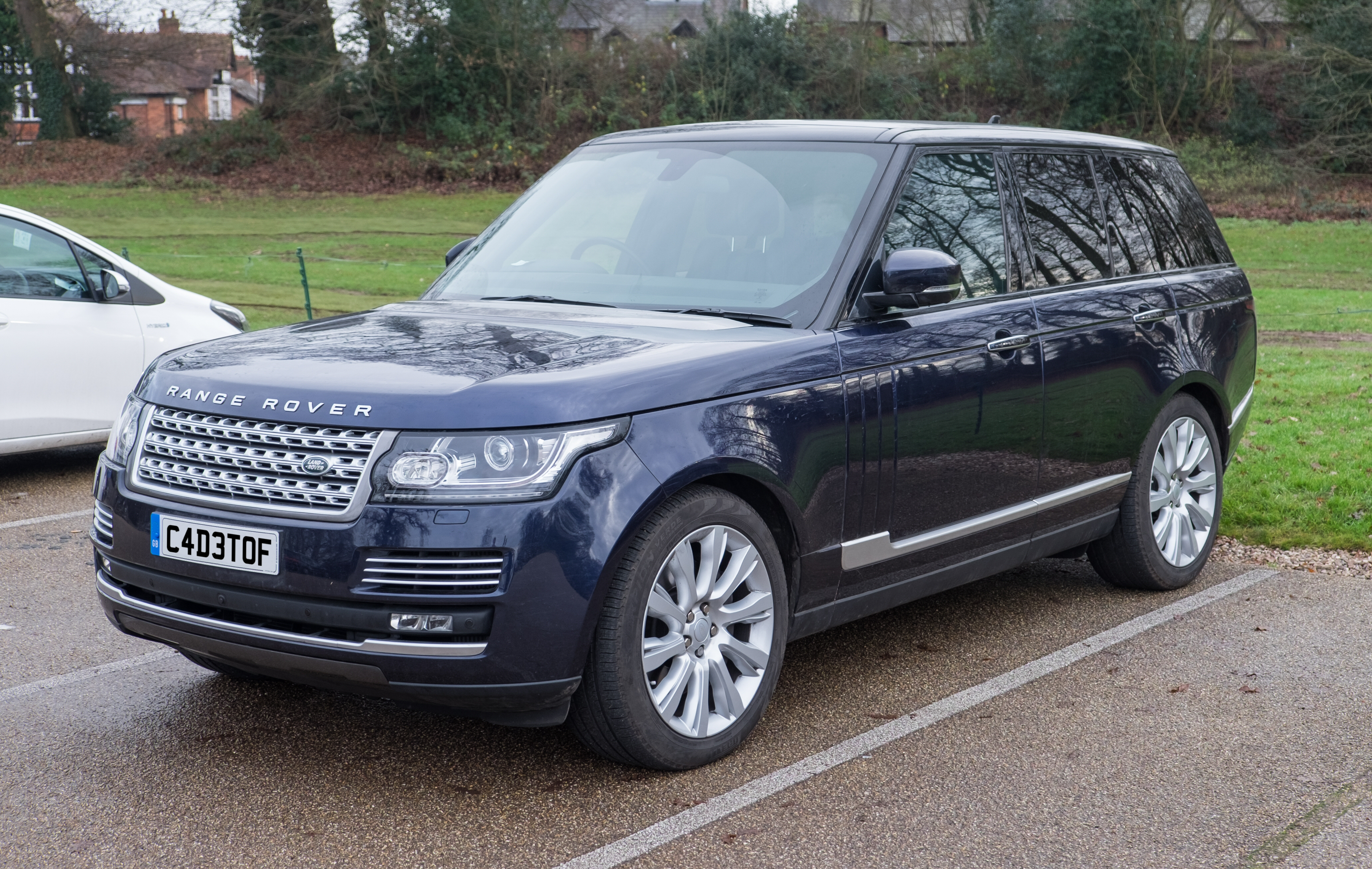

Overview
- Production: 2012–2021
- Model years: 2013–2021
- Assembly: United Kingdom: Solihull (Solihull plant)
- Designer: Gerry McGovern (2006)

Body and chassis
- Body style: 5-door SUV

Dimensions
- Wheelbase: 2,922 mm (115.0 in)
- Length: 4,999 mm (196.8 in)
- Width: 1,984 mm (78.1 in)
- Height: 1,835 mm (72.2 in)

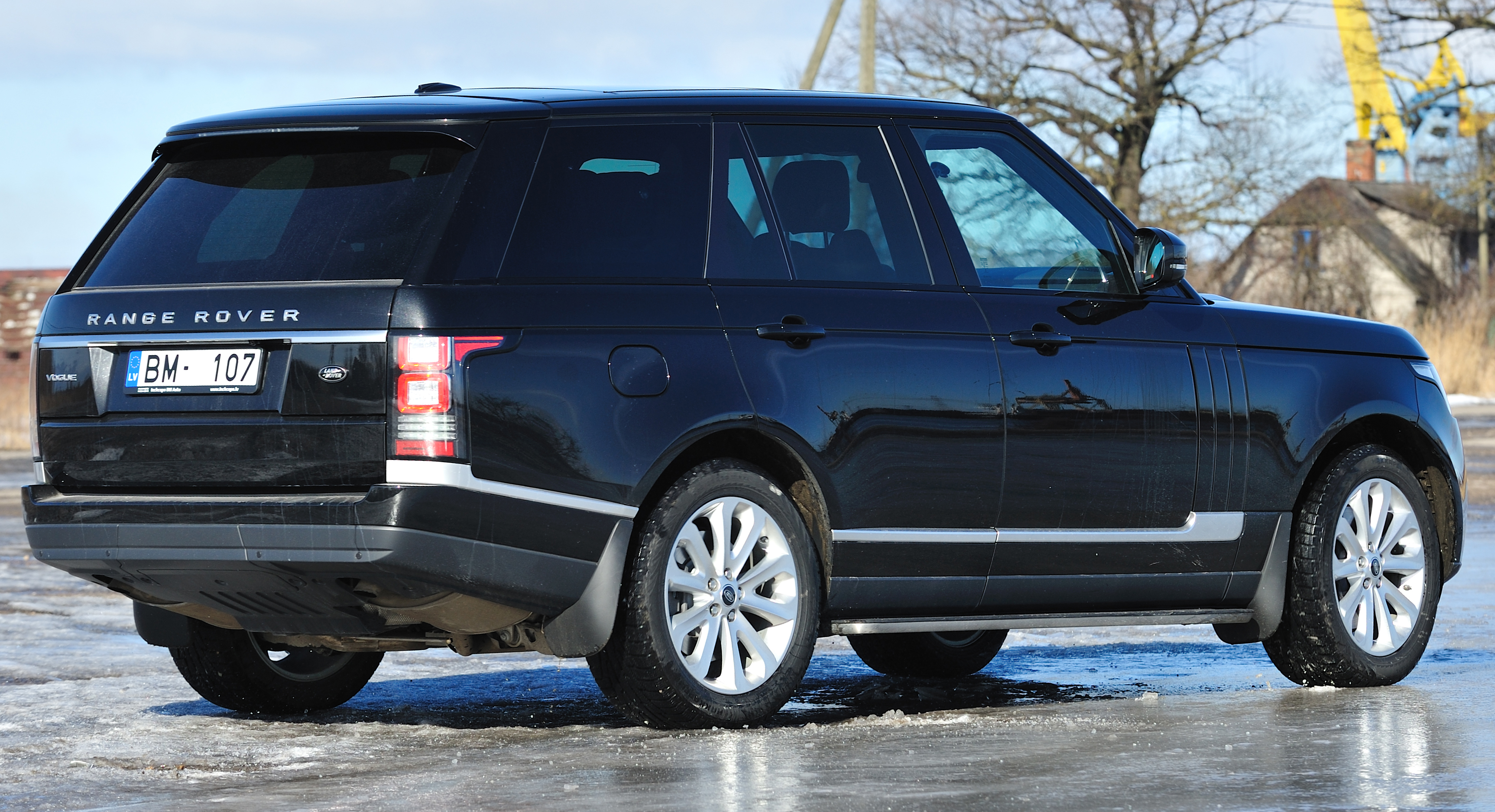
2013 Range Rover Vogue (Latvia)

The 4th generation Range Rover, codenamed L405, was exhibited in September 2012 at the 2012 Paris Motor Show.

It uses an all-aluminium monocoque unitary body structure, instead of the third generation's steel unibody — making it the first production 4x4 SUV to do so, resulting in a reduction of 420 kg (926 lb) compared to its predecessor.

The Range Rover Hybrid is a diesel-powered hybrid electric model unveiled at the 2013 Frankfurt Motor Show. The ordering process began in September 2013, and retail deliveries in Europe were slated to start in early 2014. There was also a Range Rover Plug-in Hybrid, a petrol-powered PHEV model unveiled in 2018.

In 2021 Land Rover started selling the Range Rover Sport D350 model which runs on the 3.0-litre D300 Ingenium Diesel engine.

== Fifth generation (2022) ==
Range Rover (L460)
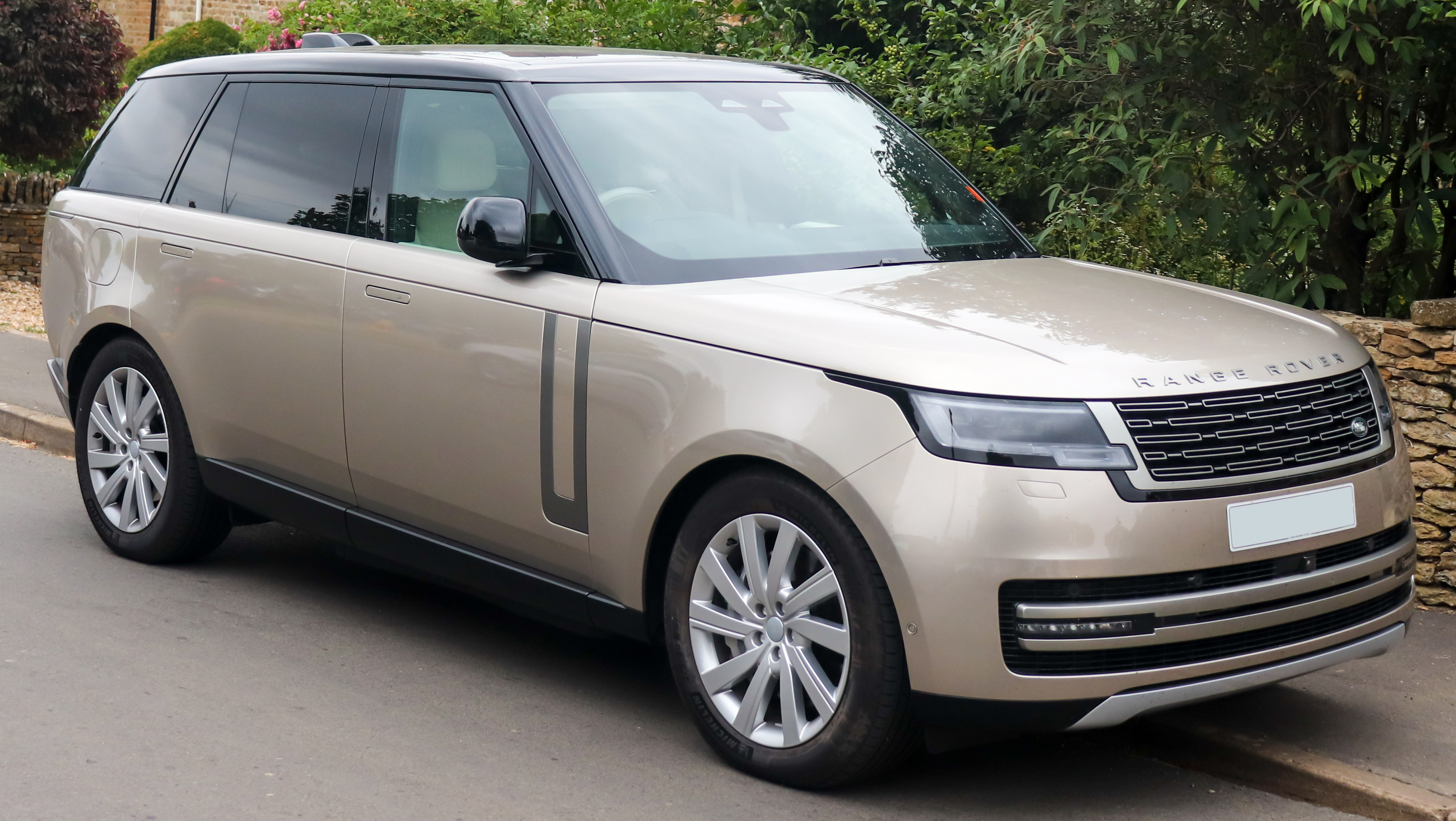

Overview
- Production: 2022–present
- Model years: 2022–present
- Assembly: United Kingdom: Solihull (Solihull plant); India: Pune (JLR India)
- Designer: Gerry McGovern

Body and chassis
- Body style: 5-door SUV

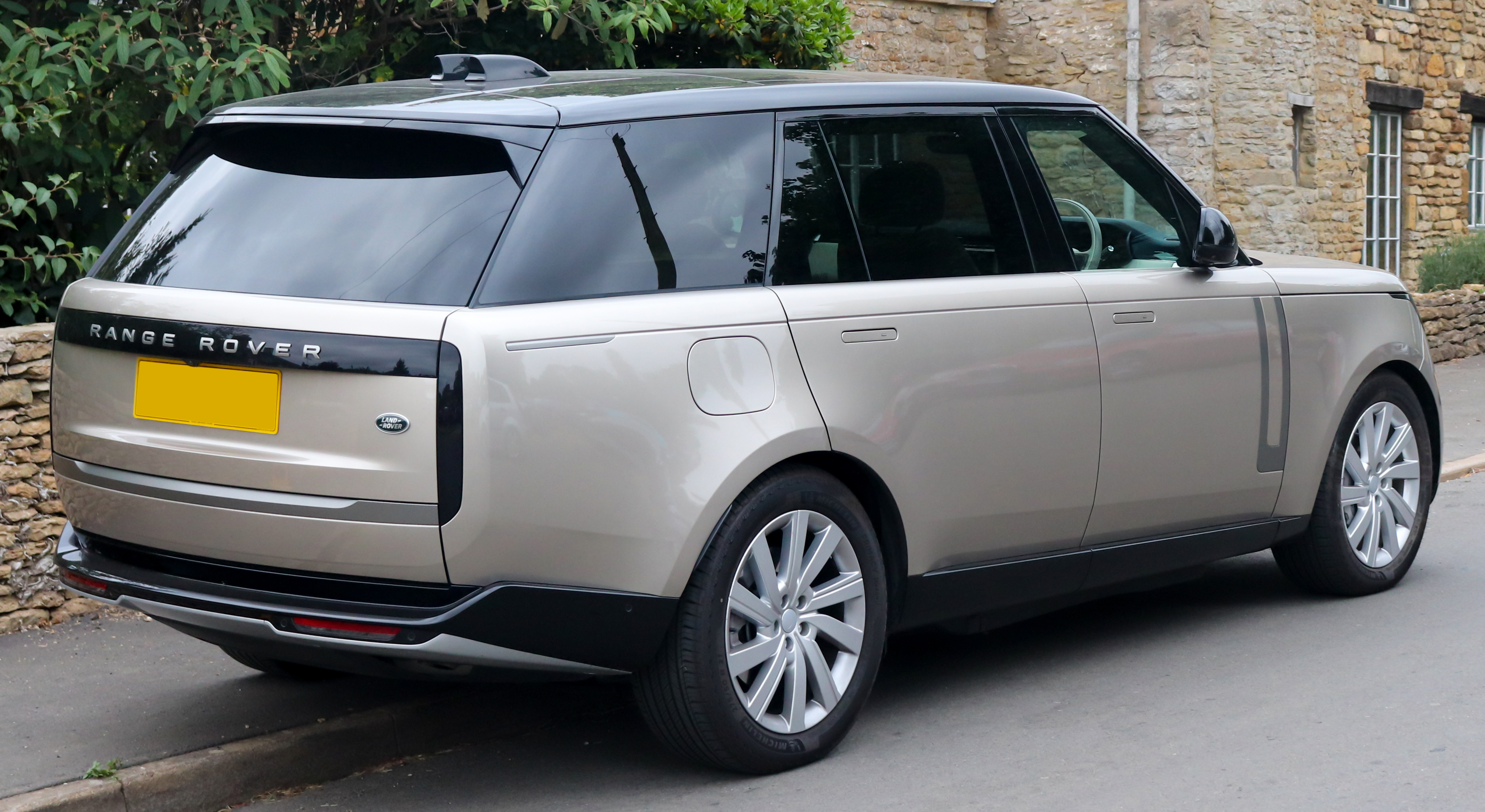
2022 Range Rover SE P440e

The fifth generation Range Rover was revealed on 26 October 2021 by the Jaguar Land Rover Chief Creative Officer and the car's designer, Gerry McGovern, at the Royal Opera House in London. As well as two PHEV, three diesel and two petrol JLR 3.0 L Ingenium I6 engine options, the car will be the first from JLR to use an engine developed under the combustion and electrified powertrain partnership agreed between JLR and BMW in 2019, as a 4.4L BMW/JLR V8 engine is also an option. It was launched with a range of mild hybrid diesel and petrol engines, with plug-in hybrids due in early 2022 and an all-electric model by 2026.

== Sales ==
The success of Jaguar Land Rover since its formation in 2008 is reflected largely in the rising sales of the Range Rover. In 2009, as a severe recession took hold, just over 22,000 were sold. Four years later, it sold more than twice as many units, with more than 45,000 being sold. By 2015, Range Rover sales worldwide exceeded 60,000.

This table excludes Range Rover Sport, Evoque, and Velar. The total figure is from 2009, excluding those sold prior to that year.

| Year | Sales |
|---|---|
| 2009 | 22,001 |
| 2010 | 23,602 |
| 2011 | 29,626 |
| 2012 | 27,496 |
| 2013 | 45,077 |
| 2014 | 53,738 |
| 2015 | 60,226 |
| 2016 | 55,728 |
| Total | 317,494 |

== Motorsport ==
A Range Rover was used to win the 1979 inaugural and 1981 Paris–Dakar Rally, completing a race distance in each case of approx 10,000 km. Range Rovers also competed in the East African Safari Rally.

== Additional models ==
=== Range Rover Sport ===
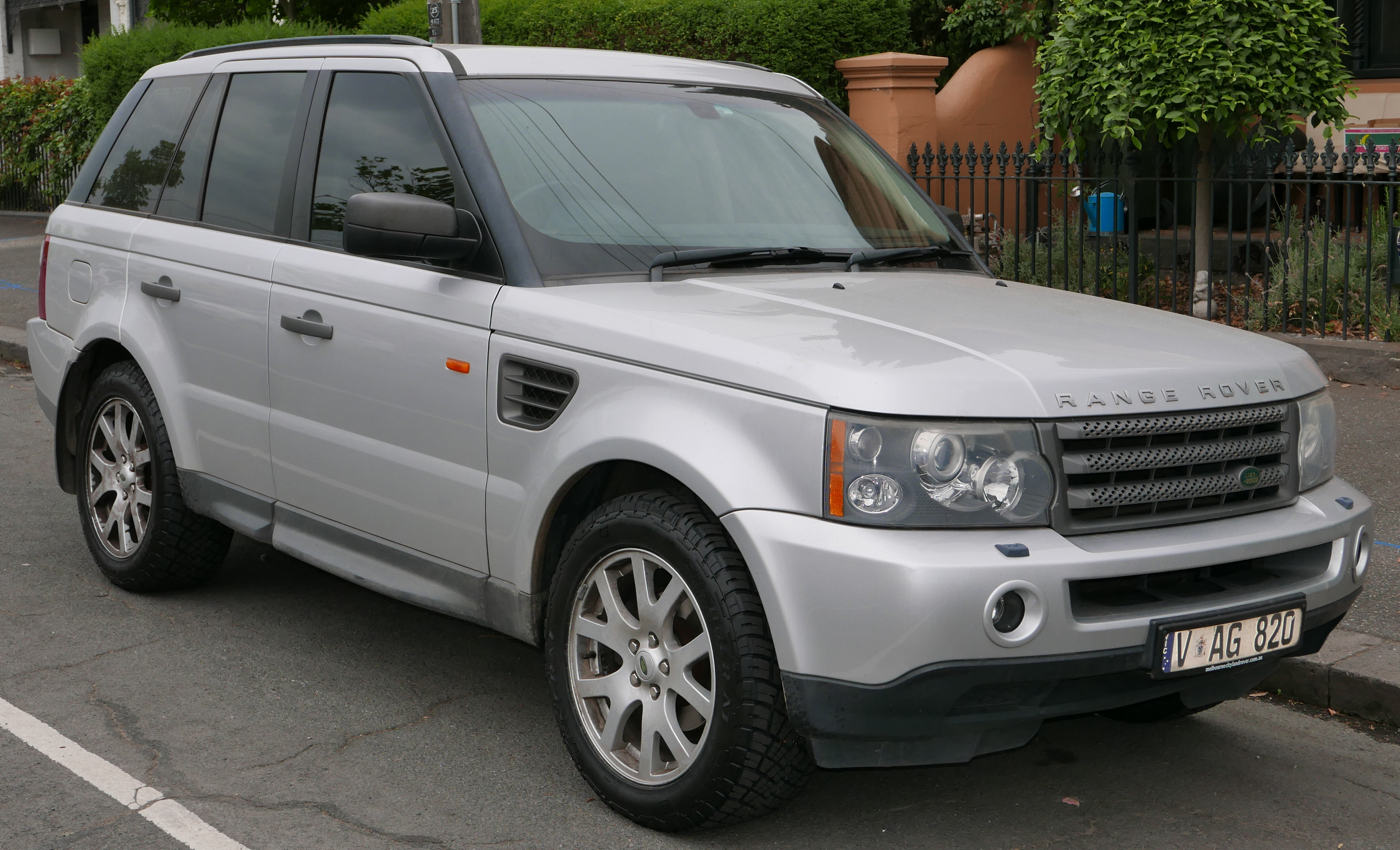
Range Rover Sport (first generation)

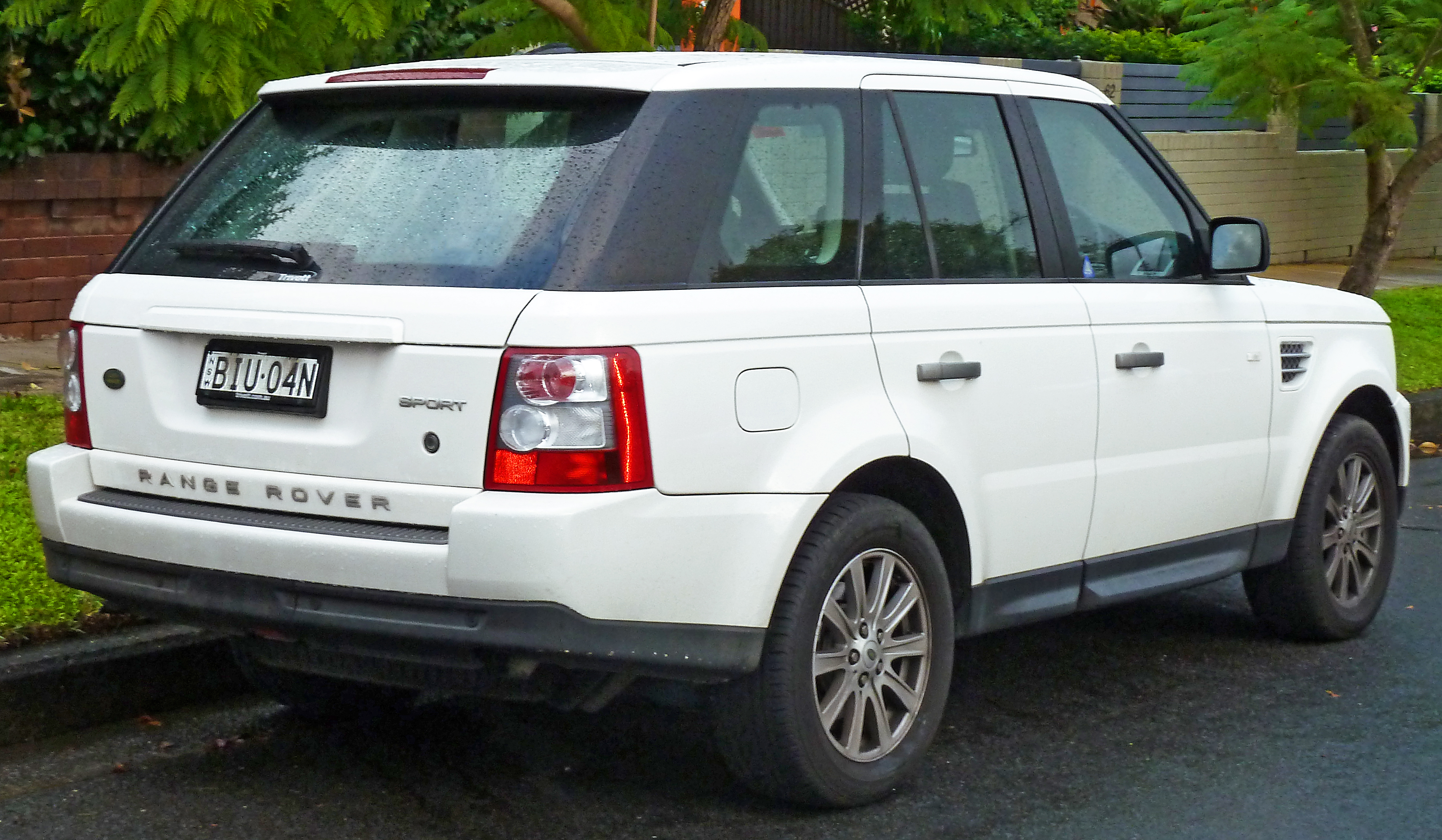
Range Rover Sport (first generation)

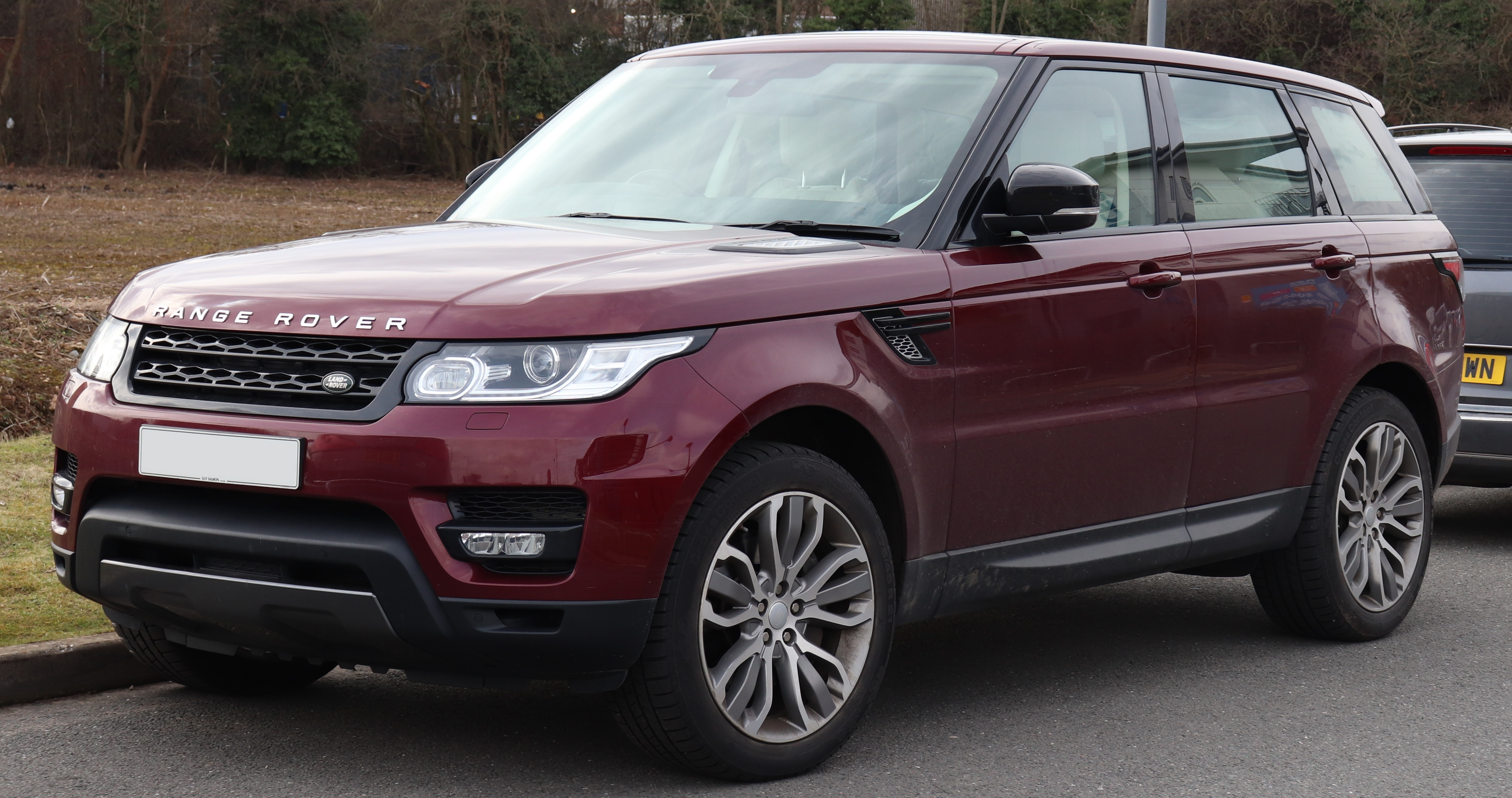
Range Rover Sport (second generation)

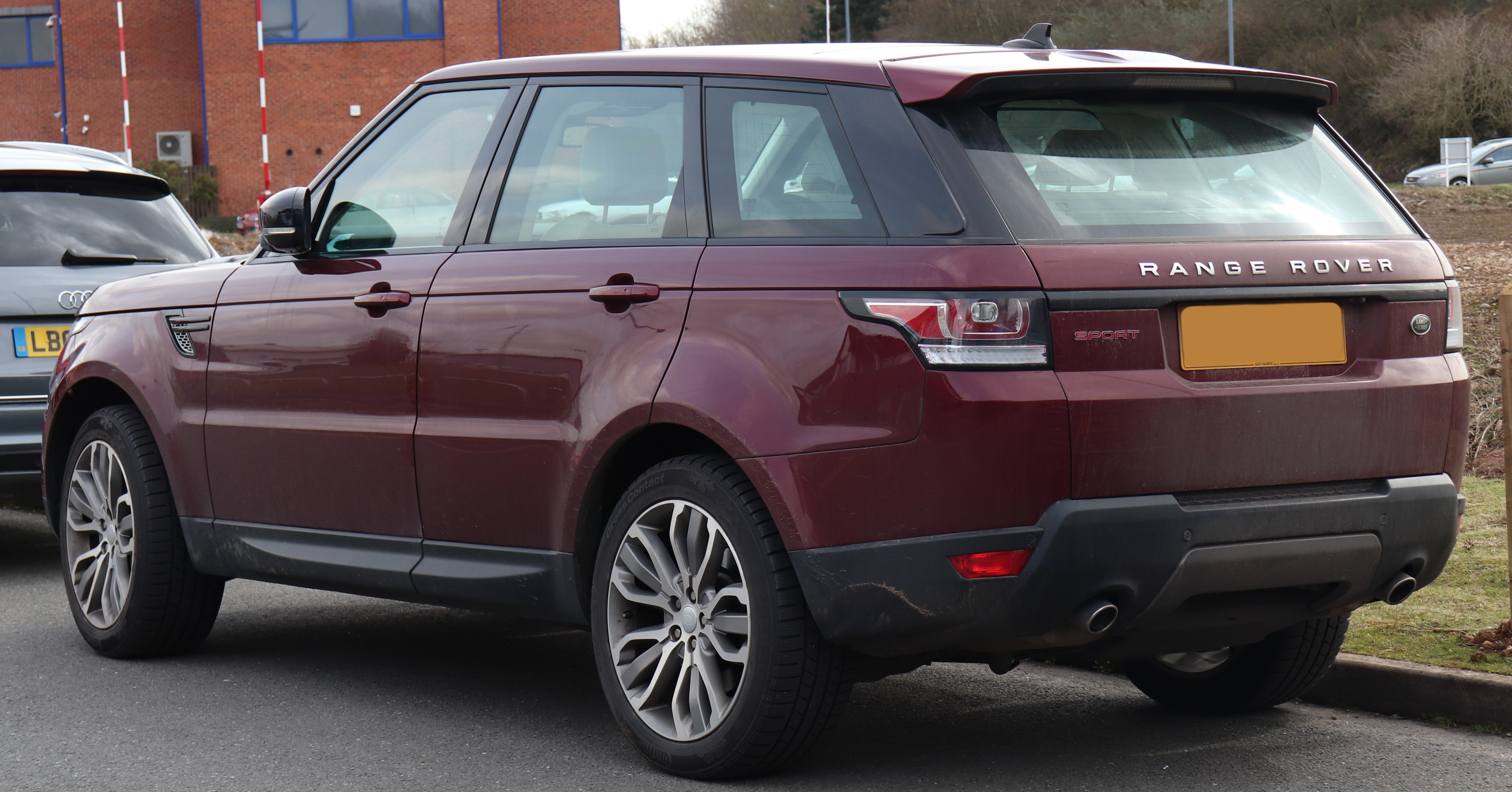
Range Rover Sport (second generation)

On 26 November 2004, Land Rover released the first photographs of the Range Rover Sport, a new model it planned to show to the public for the first time at the 2004 North American International Auto Show. The Range Rover Sport is a production car development of the Range Stormer concept vehicle the company showcased in the 2004 North American International Auto Show. Though called the Range Rover Sport "L320", it was not merely a new specification within the Range Rover line-up, but rather an adapted Discovery "L319", or T5 Platform Discovery/LR3 with Range Rover exterior styling and Range Rover interior seating and dash forms, a shortened wheelbase, smaller luggage capacity and a single rather than split tailgate which was angled back for styling improvements. With entry model pricing close to upper Discovery models, the Sport became the biggest seller of all the Land Rover products. This model was released for sale in late 2004 as a 2004 model.

In 2013 a redesigned version was released for sale as a 2014 model year "L494". Unlike the original and current Discovery, it does not have steel chassis rails, but is based on the new D7u alloy platform, which much more resembles the current flagship Range Rover with closer equipment levels and capabilities in a smaller body style. Hence the L494 Range Rover Sport is around 400 kg lighter than the previous generation and benefits in performance due to its weight reduction.

=== Range Rover Evoque ===
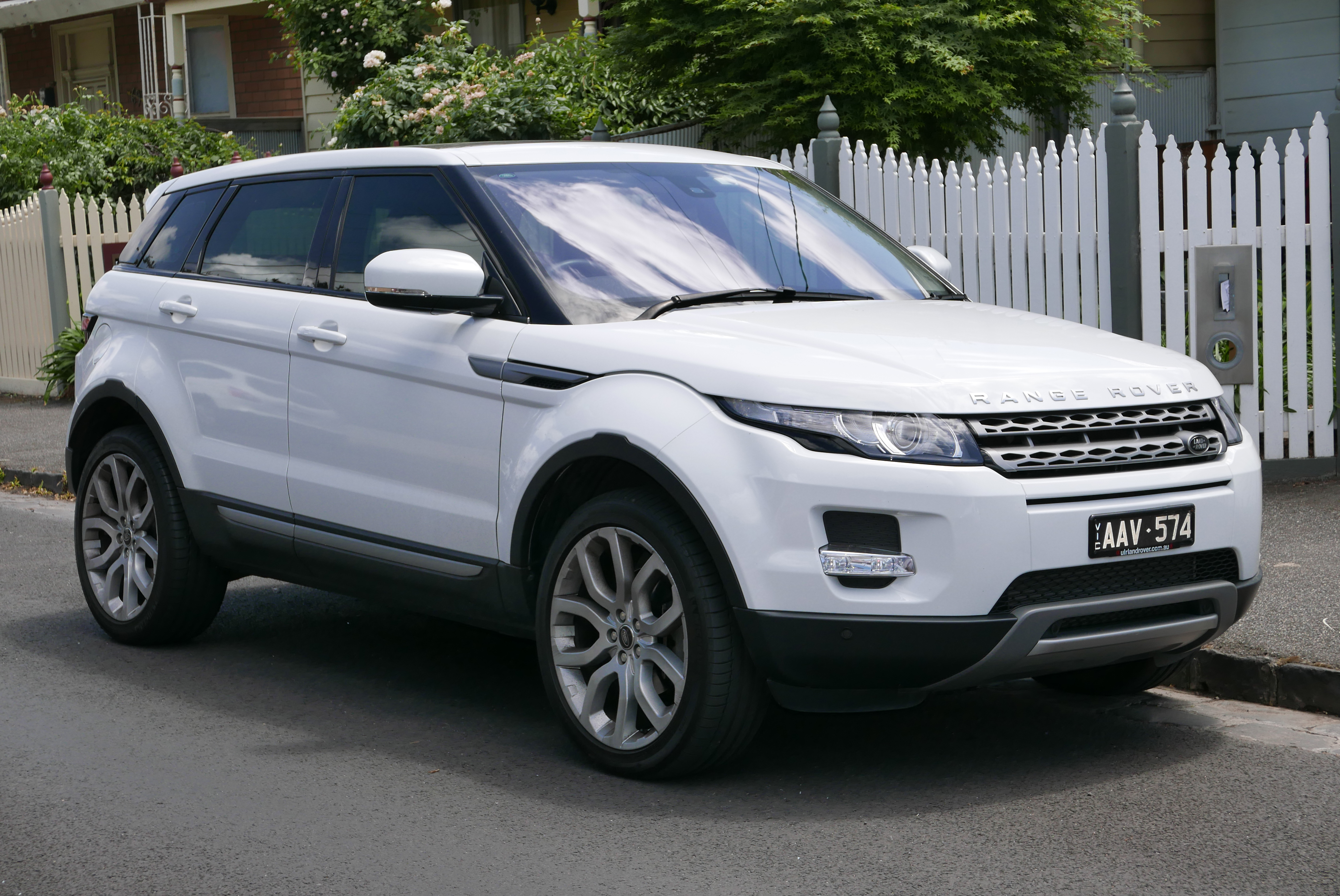
Range Rover Evoque five-door

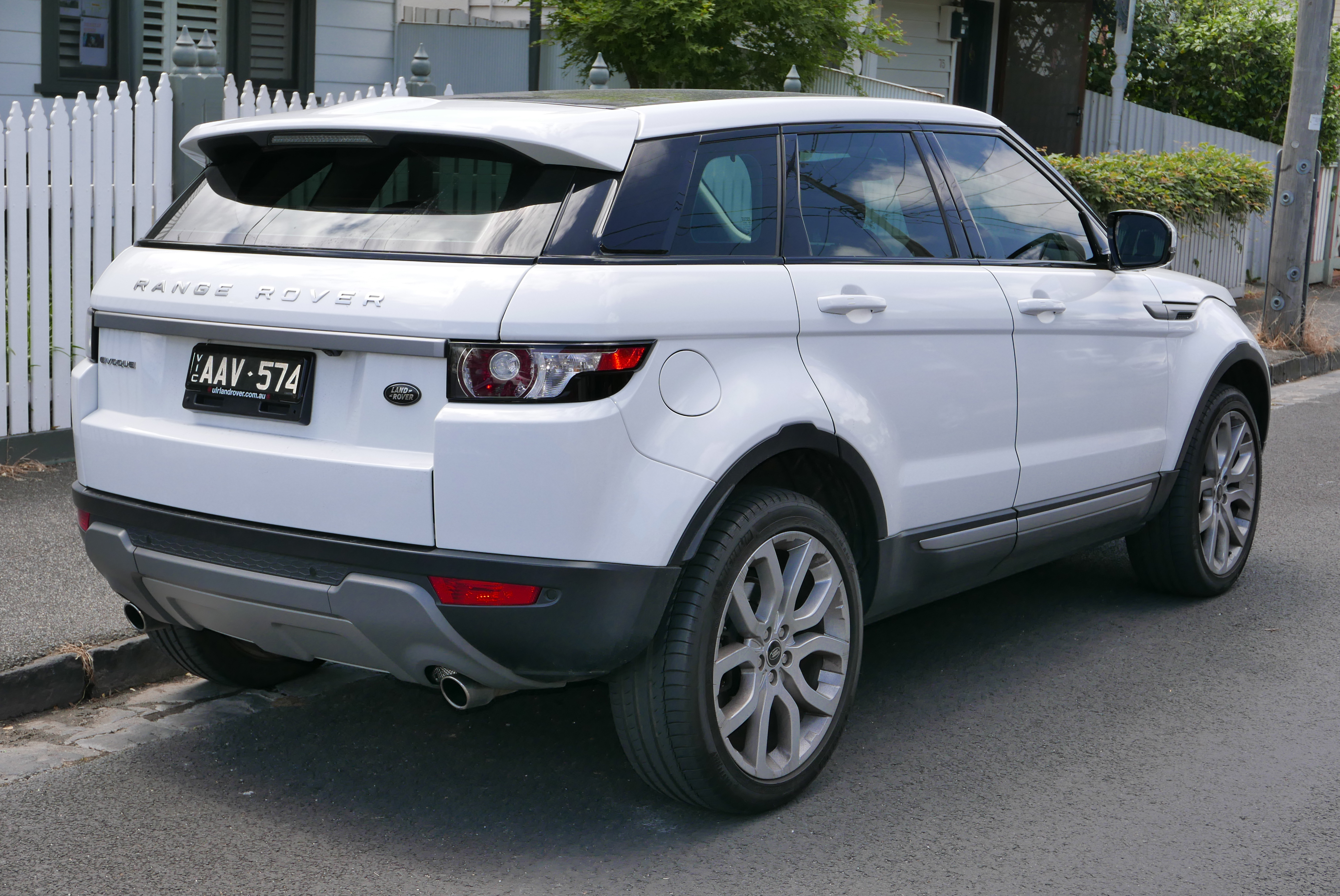
Range Rover Evoque five-door

The Range Rover Evoque, which went into production in July 2011, has its roots in the Land Rover LRX concept car that it resembles. It is available with either a three-door or five-door hatchback body, front-wheel drive or four-wheel drive, and with a 2-litre turbocharged petrol engine or one of two different power output 2.0-litre turbo-diesel engines.

In 2012, at the Geneva Motor Show, Land Rover unveiled a convertible concept, which featured four seats and a drop-down tailgate.

=== Range Rover Velar ===
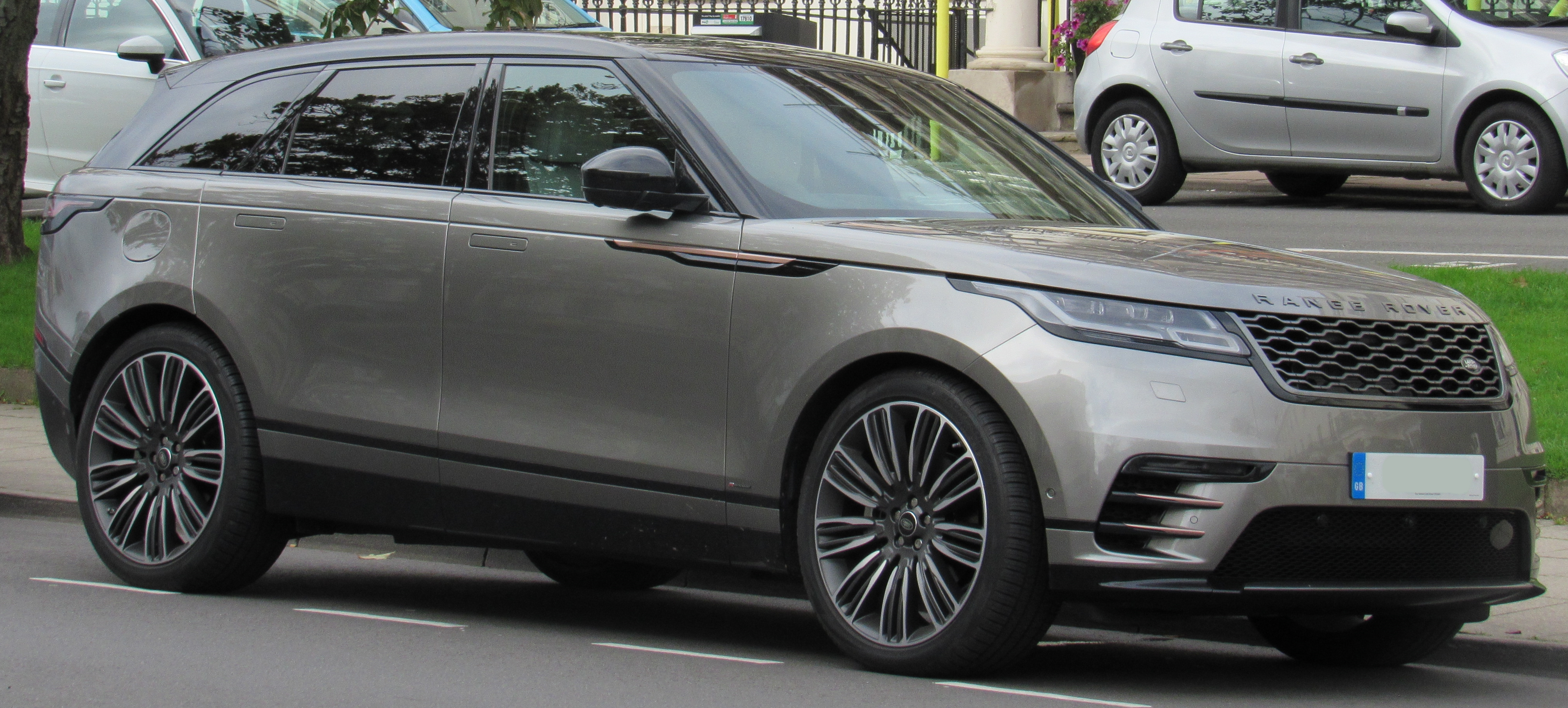
Range Rover Velar

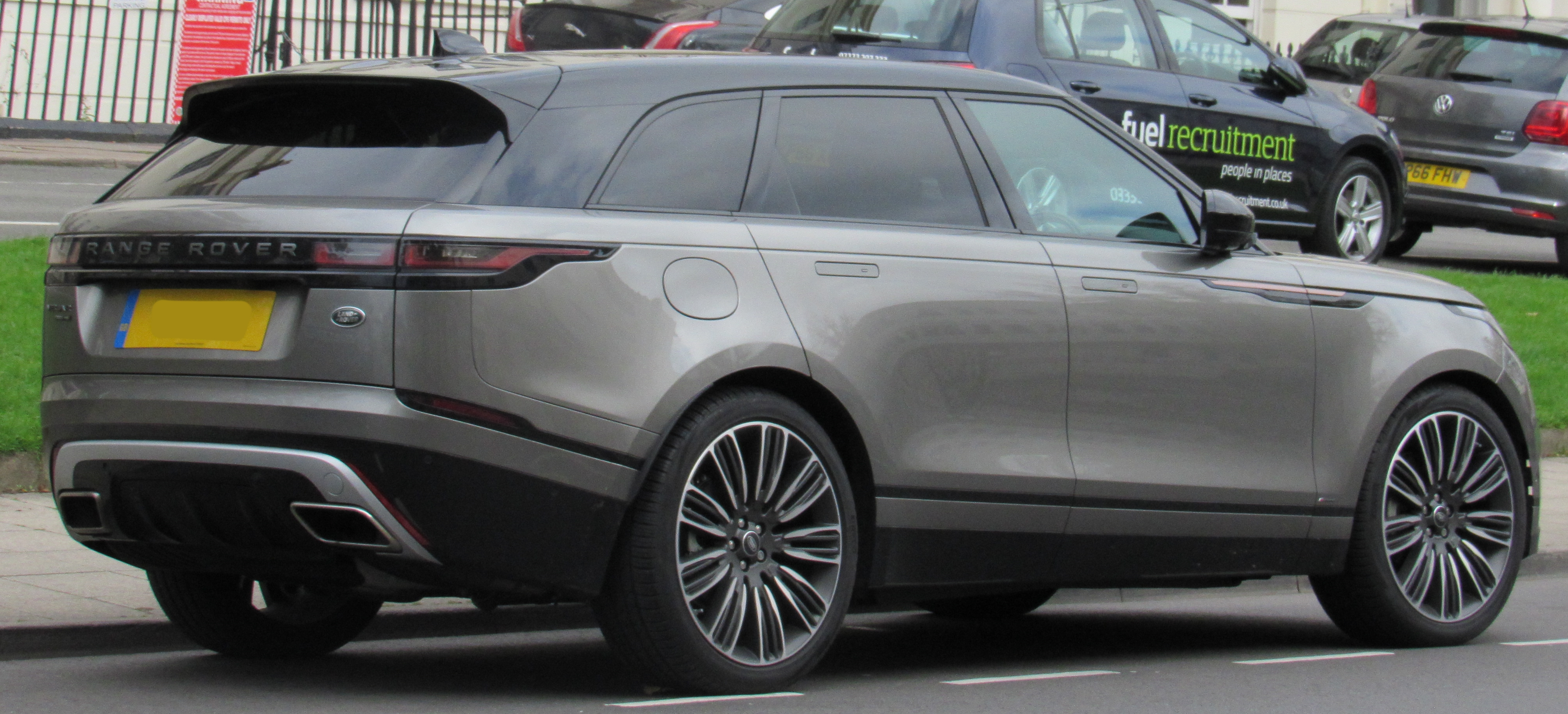
Range Rover Velar

Land Rover unveiled a mid-size crossover using the Range Rover name in March 2017. Named the Range Rover Velar, it has a roofline running away on its bodywork and uses the same platform as the Jaguar F-Pace, which serves as the basis for its design.

== Advertising ==
A song titled "I Found a Place in My Heart" and "Find Your Heaven", co-written by Dom James and Tommy Antonio for Range Rover commercials, is sung by Emma Smith.

== Criticism ==
The Range Rover brand has attracted some controversy, particularly from those concerned with the potential negative environmental impact of large, luxury vehicles. In 2005, members of Greenpeace temporarily disrupted Range Rover production at the Land Rover plant in Solihull.

In 2004, Spen King criticised owners of off-roaders who drove their vehicles in urban areas, saying that vehicles like the Range Rover he created were "never intended as a status symbol but later incarnations of my design seem to be intended for that purpose."

In 2014 it was reported that Range Rovers could be opened and started using hand-held equipment readily available from eBay. High levels of theft led The Times to report that "High-end motor insurers are refusing to cover new Range Rovers in London after a series of thefts."

Range Rovers, according to AutoTrader, "can be complicated, costly vehicles, and are loaded with very expensive parts." Reliability issues are common complaints. J.D. Power rankings for the Land Rover are in the lowest category - known as "The Rest" - for quality overall, dependability, sales satisfaction, and customer service, with the cars only earning a "Better than Most" rank in the performance and design overall category. The Land Rover brand has "a legacy of quality problems" and ranks "at the bottom of the J.D. Power reliability ratings for three-year-old vehicles". The JD Power 2014 U.S. Customer Service Index (CSI) study ranked Land Rover last in overall customer satisfaction. However, one Motor Trend review of a 2014 Range Rover after 22,830 miles (36,741 km) turned up only two things that went wrong with the car. According to an automotive journalist, "Land Rover doesn't care about JD Power ratings because it doesn't need to care" since people "still line up for months to pay full sticker."
