= Range Rover GT =

Upcoming electric SUV by Range Rover

Overview
- Manufacturer: Jaguar Land Rover
- Production: 2027 (to commence)
- Assembly: United Kingdom: Halewood (Jaguar Land Rover Halewood)
- Designer: Gerry McGovern

Body and chassis
- Class: Luxury crossover SUV
- Body style: 5-door coupe SUV
- Layout: All-wheel-drive
- Platform: Electrified Modular Architecture (EMA)
- Chassis: Unibody

The Land Rover Range Rover GT, generally known as the Range Rover GT, is an upcoming battery electric luxury crossover SUV to be produced by Jaguar Land Rover (JLR) under the Range Rover marque. It will be the first model on JLR's Electrified Modular Architecture (EMA) platform.

== History ==
The Range Rover GT was officially teased on 22 July 2026, including camouflaged exterior images and a full reveal of the interior design. Although the GT has been referred to as the second-generation Velar, Range Rover has confirmed that it is the fifth member of the Range Rover family and will not replace the Velar.

== Overview ==
The Range Rover GT will initially be available with a battery electric powertrain only, though a hybrid model is set to join the lineup later. Based on JLR's new Electrified Modular Architecture (EMA) platform, production is set to commence at JLR's Halewood plant in 2027.

The GT's exterior design adopts a fastback bodystyle that is lower than traditional Range Rover models. According to JLR, its body length is closer to that of the Range Rover Sport.

JLR describes the interior as following "reductive principles" with "reduced visual and acoustic noise". There are few physical buttons in the cabin, which is trimmed with sustainable materials and has no genuine leather or wood. Most functions are handled by voice or through the central OLED screen. A small driver's display sits above the steering wheel, and a head-up display is standard. A 2+2 seating arrangement is standard, though a rear bench seat is optional.

JLR claims that the GT will be the "quietest Range Rover ever" and that it will be able to retain full performance in temperatures ranging −40 to 50 °C (−40 to 122 °F).
