= Squire Car Manufacturing Company =

Squire
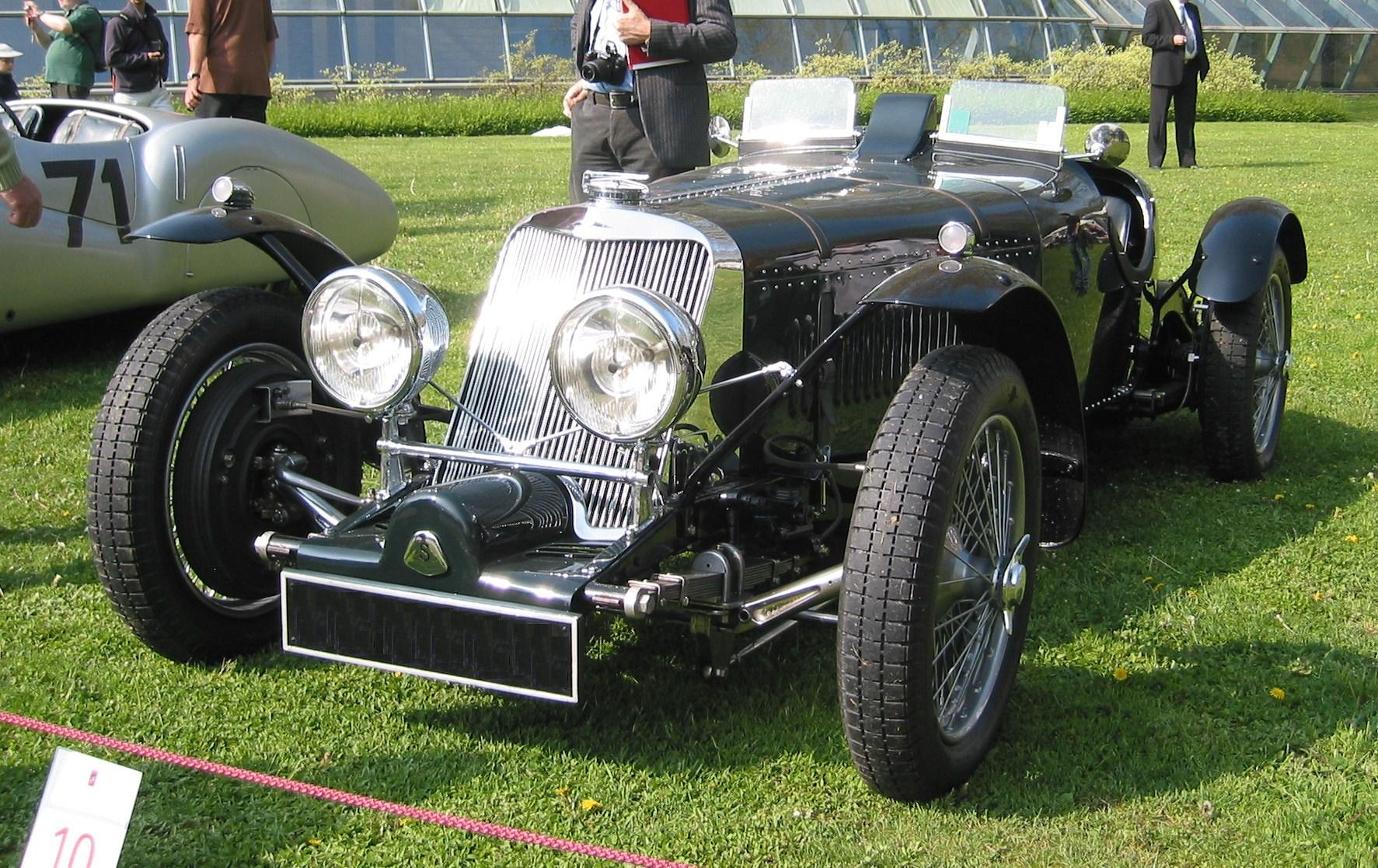

Overview
- Manufacturer: Squire Car Manufacturing Company
- Production: 1935–1936. 7 made
- Designer: Adrian Squire

Body and chassis
- Class: Sports car

Powertrain
- Engine: 1,496 cc Straight-4 overhead camshaft
- Transmission: 4 speed pre-selector

Dimensions
- Wheelbase: 102 or 125 inches (2,589 or 3,172 mm)

The Squire Car Manufacturing Company was a British auto manufacturer of the 1930s, based in Henley-on-Thames, Oxfordshire. It was founded as Squire Motors Ltd by 21-year-old Adrian Squire (1910–1940), formerly of Bentley and MG. Renamed as the Squire Car Manufacturing Company it produced the Squire car, which epitomised the Grand Prix car turned into road car.

After Frazer-Nash temporarily cast aside British Anzani, Squire seized the opportunity to use Anzani's R1 100 bhp (75 kW) 1,496 cc twin-cam engine. They were purchased from Anzani with a Squire emblem cast into them. Blown versions were available.

Very few were made, but it held a reputation for exceptional top speed and braking. Squire designed and built a fine rigid chassis offered in two lengths for two or four seat versions with attractive bodywork by Vanden Plas.

The car was too expensive even with cheaper bodywork from Markham of Reading, and financial difficulties ended production in 1936. A Vanden Plas two seater cost £1,220 which was Bugatti money and even the Markham cost £995. Squire himself went on to join Lagonda and was working for the Bristol Aeroplane Company when killed in an air raid in 1940.

Two or possibly three more cars were assembled from left over parts by Valfried Zethrin in 1938 and 1939. There were plans to resume production after the war but the lack of patterns to make the engine made this uneconomical. After the war Val Zethrin pursued a new project, an updated and simplified attempt at the Squire concept, called the Zethrin Rennsport. The reliability and cost of the R1 Anzani engine had always been an issue, and post-war conditions rendered it unthinkable. Through Benjamin Bowden and John Allen's design company, contact was made with Donald Healey, who recommended using a souped up Riley Motor engine, as he had employed in the Healey-Abbott· Suspension and modified frame from the Riley stable provided the back-bone for what was to be an interesting but doomed venture. 180 bhp from the heavily modified engine was forecast, coupled to a fairly advanced body, suggesting that a 135 mph maximum speed was achievable. It seems that this project went little further than a road-going prototype with rudimentary bodywork. Zethrin did not have the technical expertise of Adrian Squire, and failed to ensure sufficient industry interest in what seemed a flight of fancy, in an era of austerity. Lack of funds and backers falling away put paid to the Rennsport becoming available for purchase.

== See also ==
- List of car manufacturers of the United Kingdom
