= Triumph Super 9 =

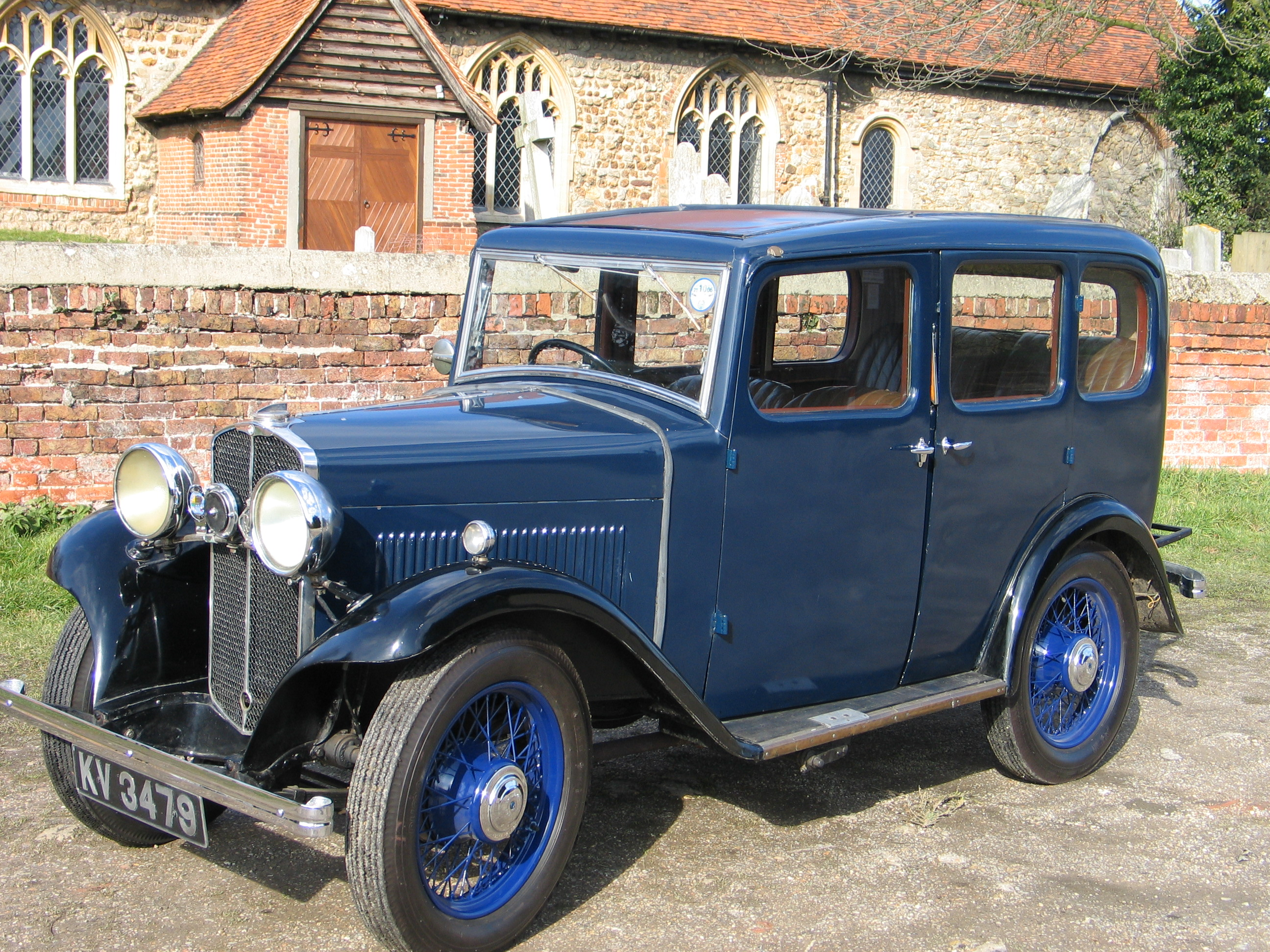

Overview
- Manufacturer: Triumph Motor Company
- Production: 1931–1933; 9000 made

Body and chassis
- Body style: 4-seat tourer saloon

Powertrain
- Engine: 1018 cc I4
- Transmission: 4-speed manual

Dimensions
- Wheelbase: 87 inches (2210 mm)
- Length: 135 inches (3429 mm)

Chronology
- Predecessor: Triumph Super 7

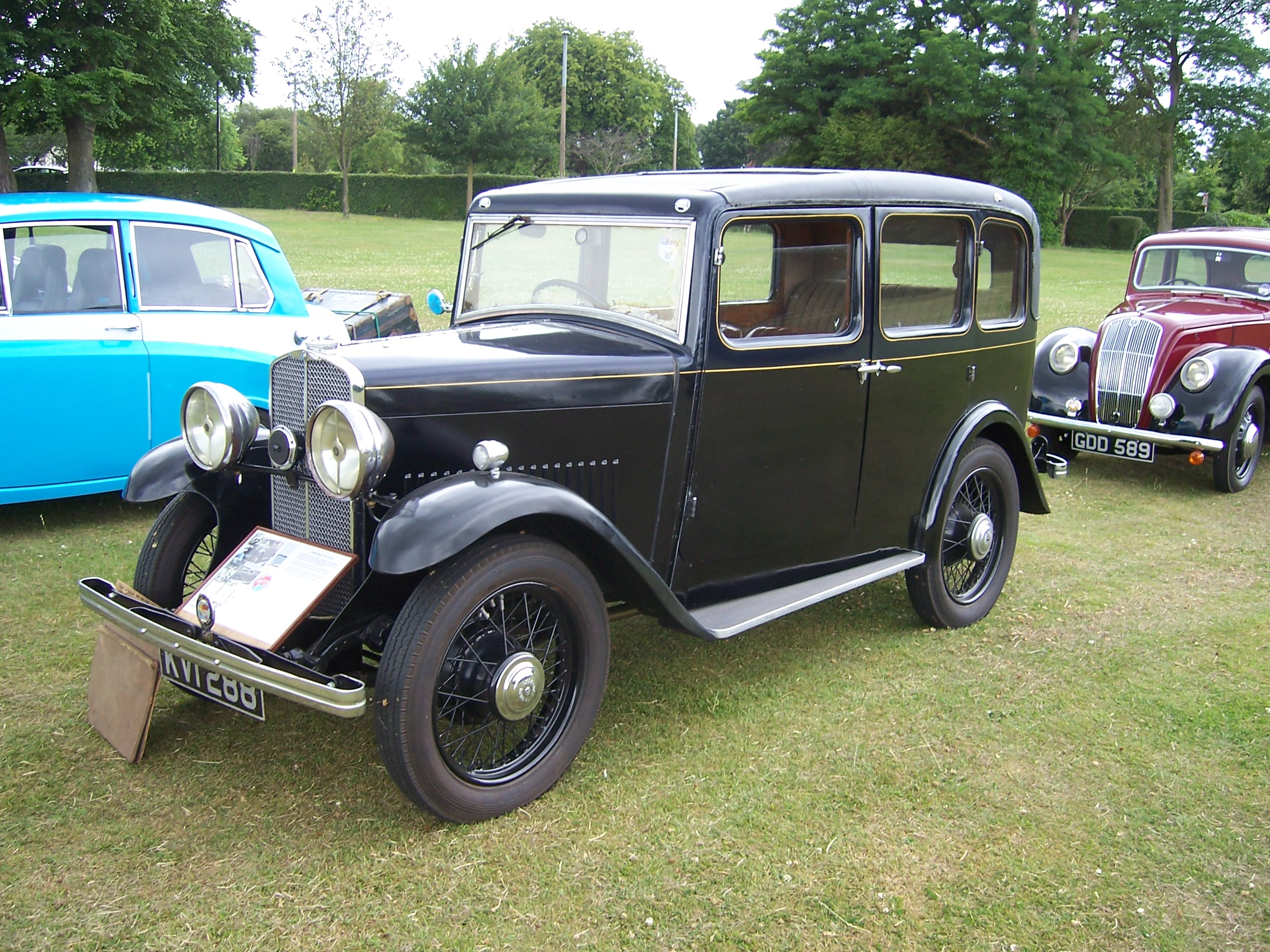
Triumph Super 9 - 6 Light coachbuilt saloon prototype, built 1931

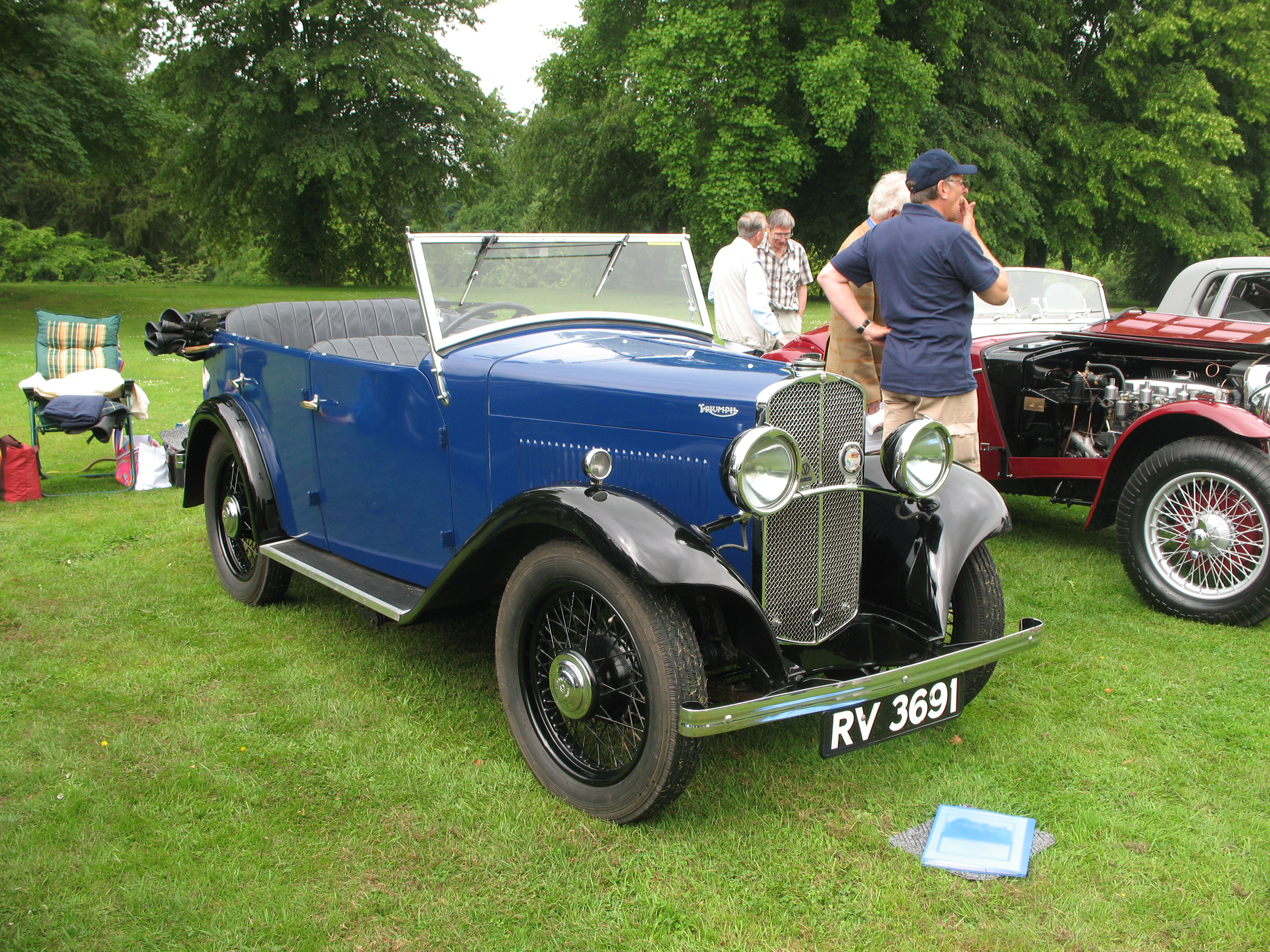
Triumph Super 9 - 4 Door Tourer 1933, price new £198

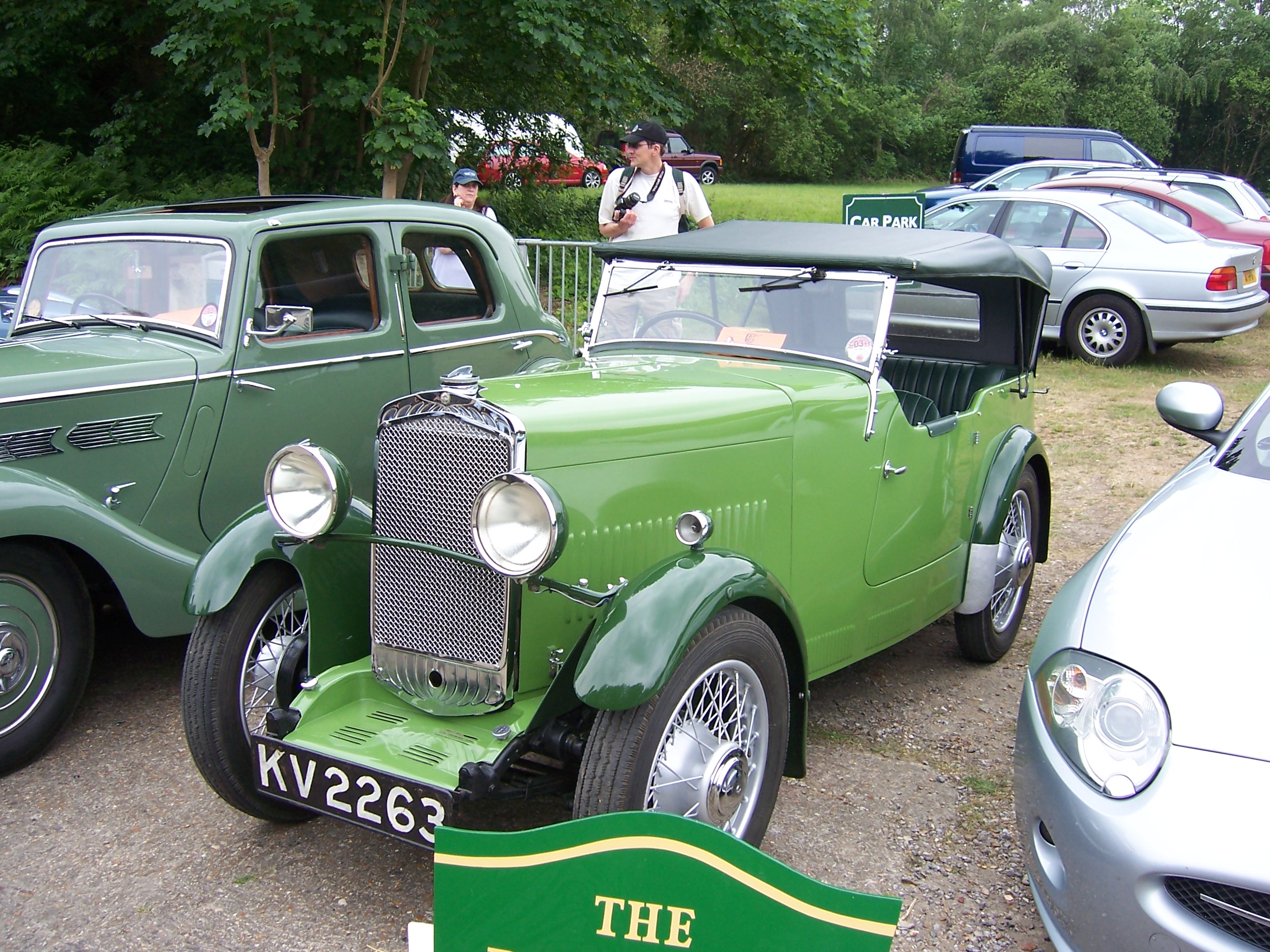
Triumph 9. Southern Cross 1932, price new £225

The Triumph Super 9 was a British motorcar model, first introduced by the Triumph Motor Company in 1931 at a price of £185. It continued through into 1933. It had an RAC rating of 8.9 hp.

The Super 9's were the first Triumphs to use 12-volt electrics (early Southern Cross's still used 6-volt for a short period) and the first to be fitted with a Coventry Climax engine, which was made under licence by Triumph. Two 6-volt batteries were housed under the rear passenger floor, while the prototype had a single 12-volt battery on the bulk head. Many of the chassis and transmission components were left overs from the Super 7's and 8's.

== Engine ==
The Coventry Climax engines are of the IOE configuration, with a bore of 60 mm and a stroke of 90 mm, giving 1018 cc. Generally a Solex side-draught carburettor was fitted. During 1931 the rear of the engine was supported on a 3/16-inch steel plate spanning across the chassis, consequently the gearbox bell housing was deep and with the starter alongside. Later cars had a cast-iron flywheel housing and a much shallower bell housing, the starter was then repositioned alongside the engine. This arrangement was used on later Super 9s & 10's and on Glorias. The cooling water is circulated by thermal syphon aided by the sloping shape of the aluminium water manifold on the head. The dynamo is driven by a Duplex chain with the distributor mounted at the rear end of the dynamo. A top speed of 60 mph was obtainable with a cruising speed of 45 mph. Petrol consumption in the region of 35 mpg for a car weighing 19 cwt. unladen.

== Steering ==
Steering is by worm and wheel, the drop shaft attached to the wheel is on three keyways so it can be turned through 120 degrees to compensate for wear. Adjustment is provided for engagement of the worm to the wheel.

== Transmission and suspension ==
Transmission is through a single 8 1/4-inch clutch plate along with a 4-speed-and-reverse gear box. The hand brake operated a transmission brake attached to the rear end of the gear box. A conventional Hardy Spicer prop shaft connected it to the axle. The rear axle is a worm and wheel with underslung worm, making for a low floor. Ratios 5.25, 5.75, 6.25/1. The brakes are Lockheed hydraulic acting on 9 1/2-inch drums with one leading and one trailing shoe on all 4 wheels. The petrol tank is at the rear, unlike Super 7's which had a gravity tank. Fuel was pumped either by Autovac or SU Petrolift.

Suspension consists of 4 semi-elliptic springs on rubber bushes damped by Luvax hydraulic shock absorbers. Cars after 1931 replaced the rubber bushes with bronze bushes and grease nipples. Wheels were of the Magnum type with 5 studs fitted with 4.50×19-inch pneumatic tyres. The car had a track of 3 ft 7 1/2 in and a wheelbase of 7 ft 8 in.

== Bodies ==
There were three significant models on the same chassis, a 4-door six-light saloon, a 4-door tourer and a 2-door 4-seat tourer known as the Southern Cross. The front doors on the saloon were hinged at the front, while those at the back were hinged to the rear. A sliding sun roof was standard, operated by a rotating handle above the driver. Folding rear arm rests were fitted but do not appear on the prototype. The most noticeable differences between 1931 cars and the later models was a change to the radiator surround and different profiling of the front wings.

== Accessories ==
Optional extras were a luggage rack, chrome bumpers and Stevenson Jacking system. The upholstery was leather cloth with leather seating. The only known Super 9 to have Bedford Cord throughout is the prototype; this also has a smokers vent in the roof which is shown on brochures, but is not seen on any production 9's. Instruments consisted of a speedometer, clock, oil gauge and ammeter. After 1931 a petrol gauge was added, prior to this a fuel tap was incorporated to give a reserve supply. Dash switches consisted of, a dash light, interior light, ignition, and a starter button, also choke and fast running control. External lights switching, battery charge rate, and ignition timing were all at the centre of the steering wheel.
