= Donald Healey =

English car designer, rally driver and speed record holder

Donald Healey CBE
- Born: 3 July 1898; Perranporth, Cornwall, England
- Died: 13 January 1988 (aged 89); Duchy Hospital, Truro, Cornwall
- Education: Newquay College, Cornwall
- Occupations: Car designer, rally driver
- Organization(s): Triumph Motor Co; Donald Healey Motor Co; Healey Automotive Consultants
- Known for: Car designs
- Notable work: Winner Monte Carlo Rally 1931
- Spouse: Ivy Maud James
- Children: 3

Donald Mitchell Healey CBE (3 July 1898 – 13 January 1988) was a noted English car designer, rally driver and speed record holder.

== Early life ==
Born in Perranporth, Cornwall, the elder son of Frederick (John Frederick) and Emma Healey (née Mitchell), who at that time ran a general store there, at an early age Donald Healey became interested in all things mechanical, particularly aircraft. He studied engineering while at Newquay College. When he left, his father bought him an expensive apprenticeship with Sopwith Aviation Company in Kingston upon Thames, Surrey, and he joined Sopwith in 1914 continuing his engineering studies at Kingston Technical College. Sopwith had sheds at the nearby Brooklands aerodrome and racing circuit.

Barely 16 when World War I started, he volunteered for the Royal Flying Corps (RFC) in 1916, before the end of his apprenticeship, and earned his "wings" as a pilot. He went on night bombing raids, served on anti-Zeppelin patrols, and also as a flying instructor. Shot down by British anti-aircraft fire on one of the first night bombing missions of the war, he was invalided out of the RFC in November 1917 after a further series of crashes, and spent the rest of the war checking aircraft components for the Air Ministry. Following the Armistice, he returned to Cornwall, took a correspondence course in automobile engineering, and opened the first garage in Perranporth in 1920.

Donald Healey married Ivy Maud James (died 1980) on 21 October 1921 and they had three sons.

== Triumph ==
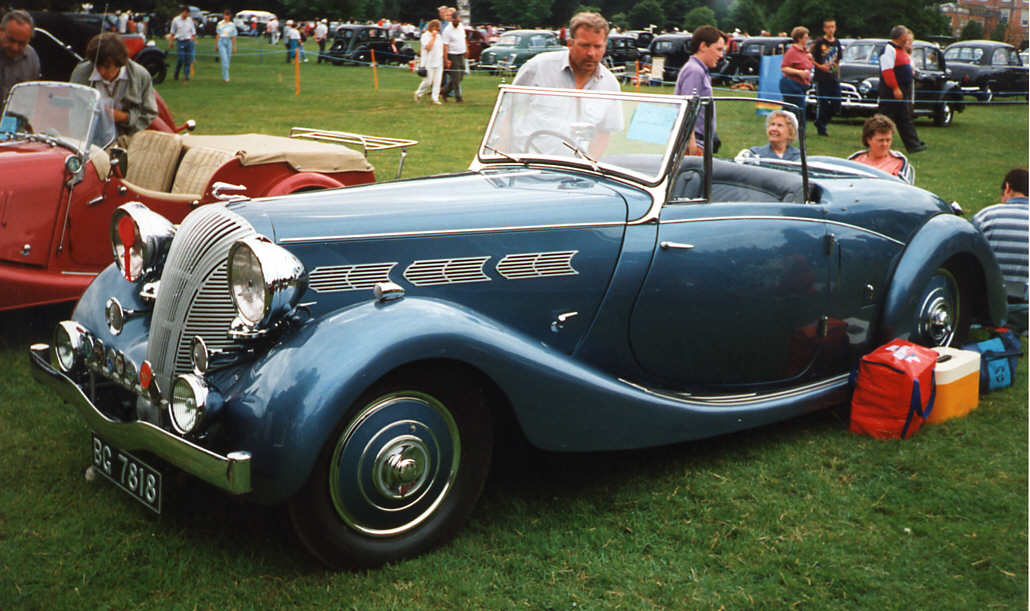
Triumph Dolomite

Healey found rally driving and motor racing more interesting than his garage and its car hire business and used the garage to prepare cars for competition. He first entered the Monte Carlo Rally in 1929 driving a Triumph 7 but in 1931 Donald Healey won the Monte Carlo Rally driving a 4½-litre Invicta and was 2nd overall the next year. Now in demand as a competition driver he sold the garage business, moved to the Midlands to work for Riley but soon moved to the Triumph Motor Company as experimental manager. The next year he was made technical director and responsible for the design of all Triumph cars. He created the Triumph Southern Cross and then the Triumph Dolomite 8 straight-eight sports car in 1935 following his class win, and 3rd overall, in the 1934 Monte Carlo Rally in a Triumph Gloria of his own design —the previous year a train demolished their Dolomite on a foggy level crossing miraculously sparing Healey and his co-driver. Triumph went into liquidation in 1939 but Healey remained on the premises as works manager for H M Hobson making aircraft engine carburettors for the Ministry of Supply. Later in the war he worked with Humber on armoured cars. Donald Healey was keen to begin making his own cars, planning post-war sports cars with colleague and chassis specialist Achille Sampietro.

== Donald Healey Motor Company ==
In 1945 he formed with Sampietro and Ben Bowden the Donald Healey Motor Company Ltd basing its business in an old RAF hangar at Warwick. Their first cars were expensive high quality cars.

=== Healey Elliot ===
Healey's first car appeared in 1946, the Healey Elliot, a saloon with a Riley engine, developed by Dr J.N.H Tait. Following his Triumphs it won the 1947 and 1948 alpine rallies and the touring class of the 1948 Mille Miglia.

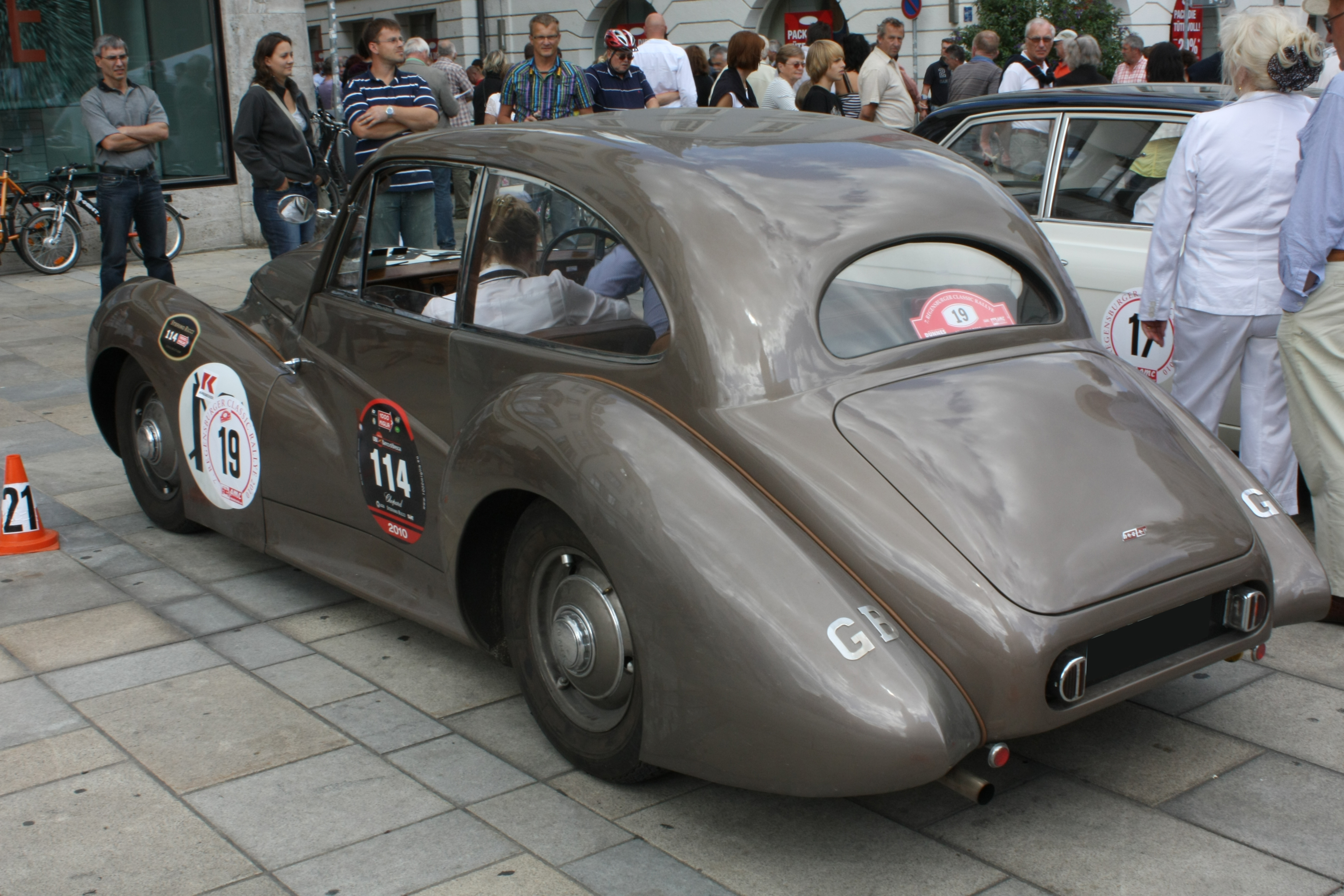
Elliott

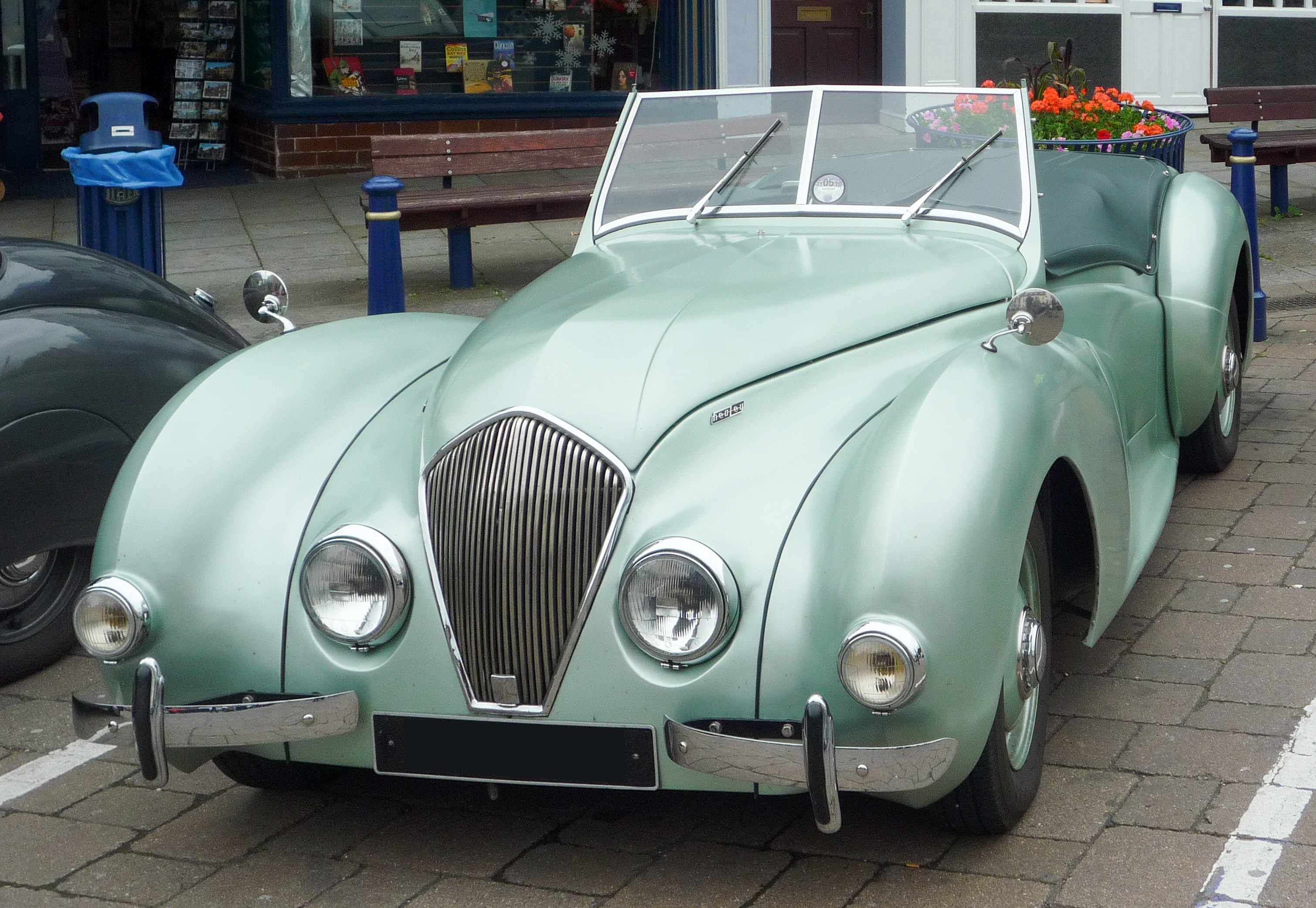
Westland

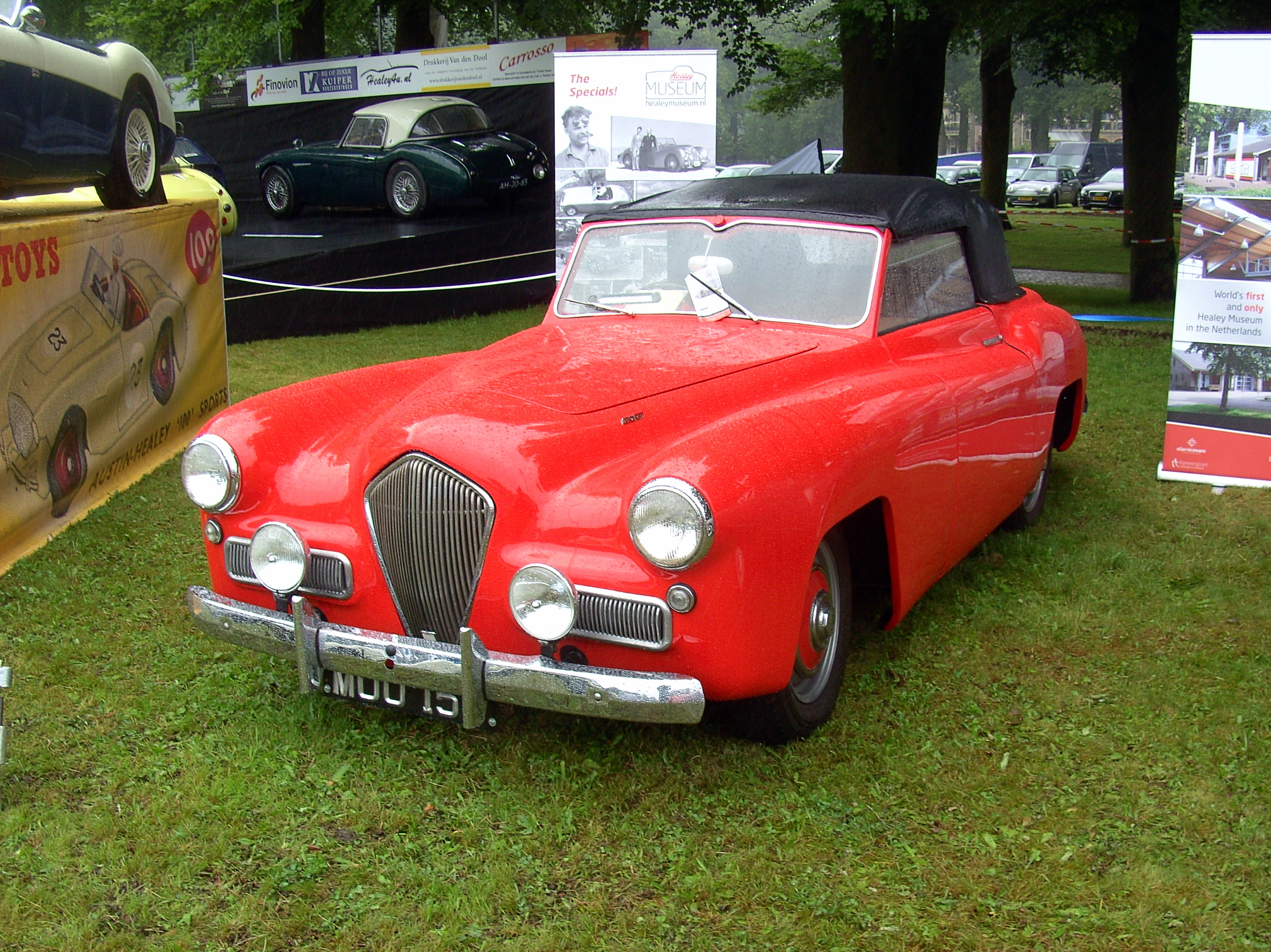
Sportsmobile

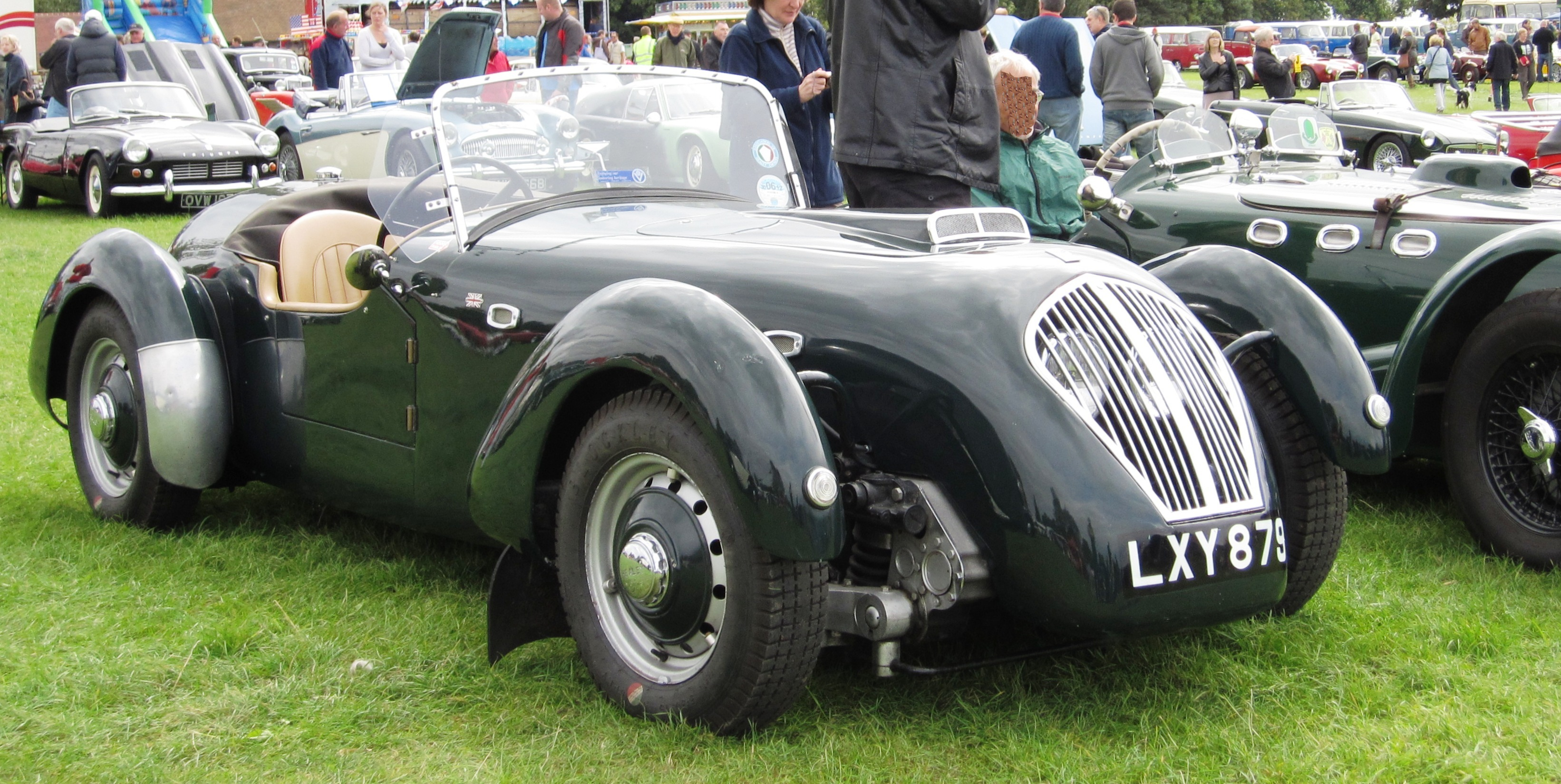
Silverstone

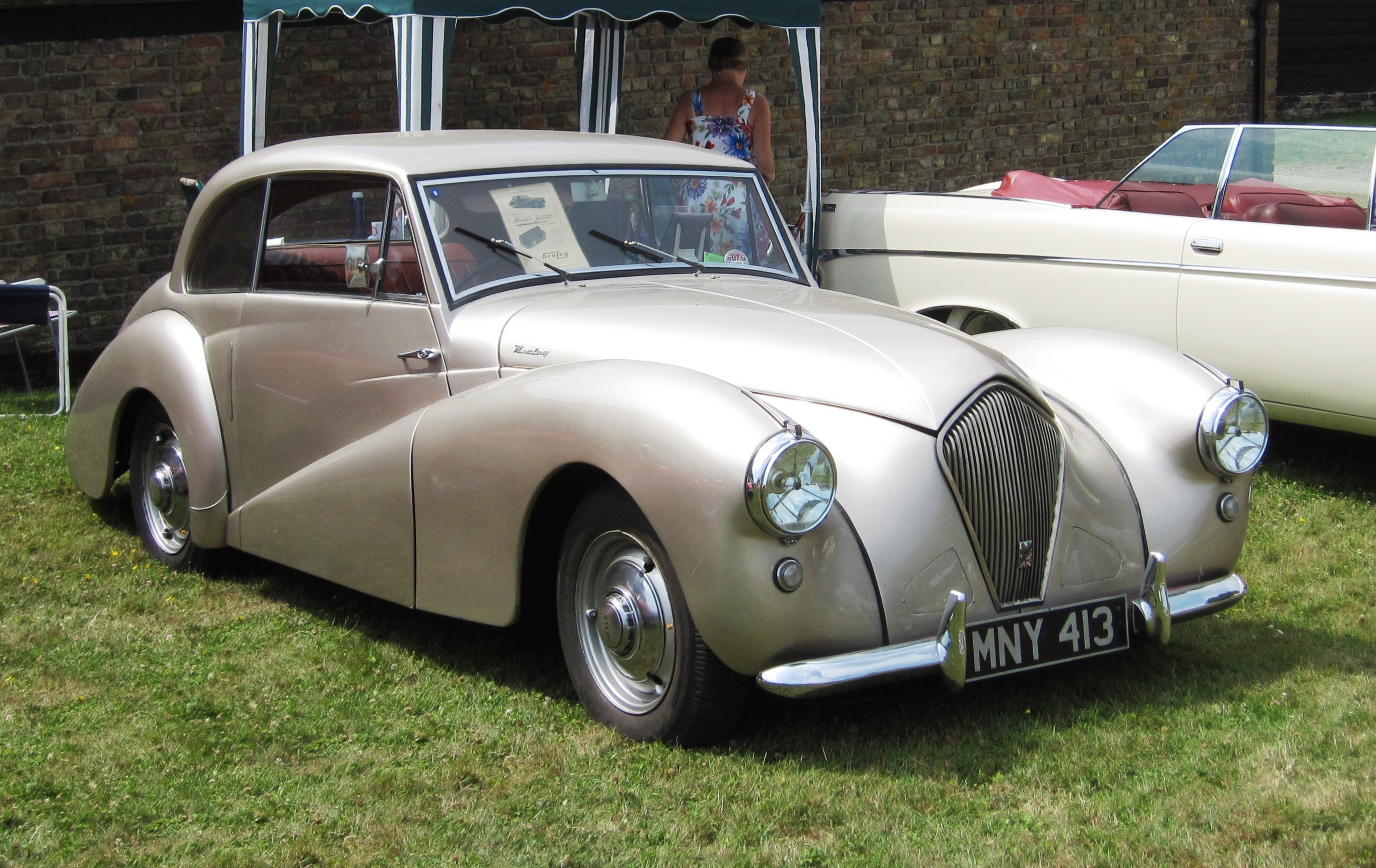
Tickford 2-door saloon

=== Healey Silverstone ===
Next was a high-performance sports car, the Silverstone which appeared in 1949 and was so successful it led to an agreement with an American company Nash Motors.

== Nash ==
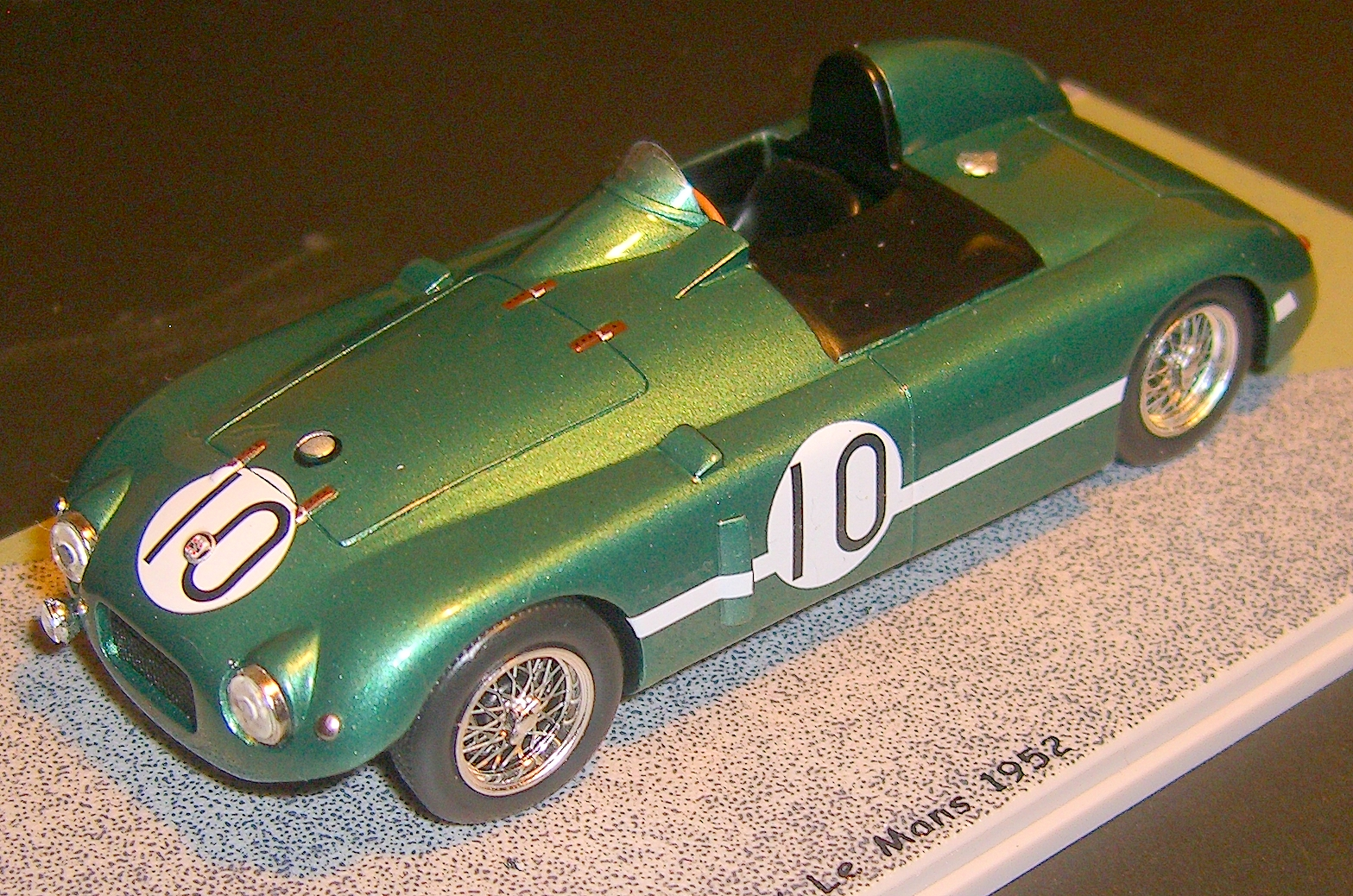
Scale model of the lightweight Nash-Healey entered in the 1952 Le Mans 24-hour race

In 1949, Healey established an agreement with George W. Mason, the president of Nash Motors to build Nash-engined Healey sports cars. The first series of the 2-seaters were built in 1951 and they were designed by Healey with styling and aerodynamic input from Benjamin Bowden. The same all-enveloping theme was used by Bowden on the Zethrin Rennsport one year later. The Nash-Healey's engine was a Nash Ambassador 6-cylinder, the body was aluminium, and the chassis was a Healey Silverstone. However, Pininfarina restyled the bodywork for 1952 and took over the production of its new steel body.

A Nash-Healey was driven by Donald Healey at Le Mans in 1950. Team members Duncan Hamilton & Tony Rolt's car finished 4th overall after suffering serious mechanical damage when hit from behind by a brakeless Delage. Donald Healey also drove a Nash-Healey in the Mille Miglia 1950 to 1952. He finished 1st in class in over 2000cc open category and was presented with the Franco Mazzotti Trophy Coppia Del Mille Miglia. Co driving with Nash.

== Austin-Healey ==
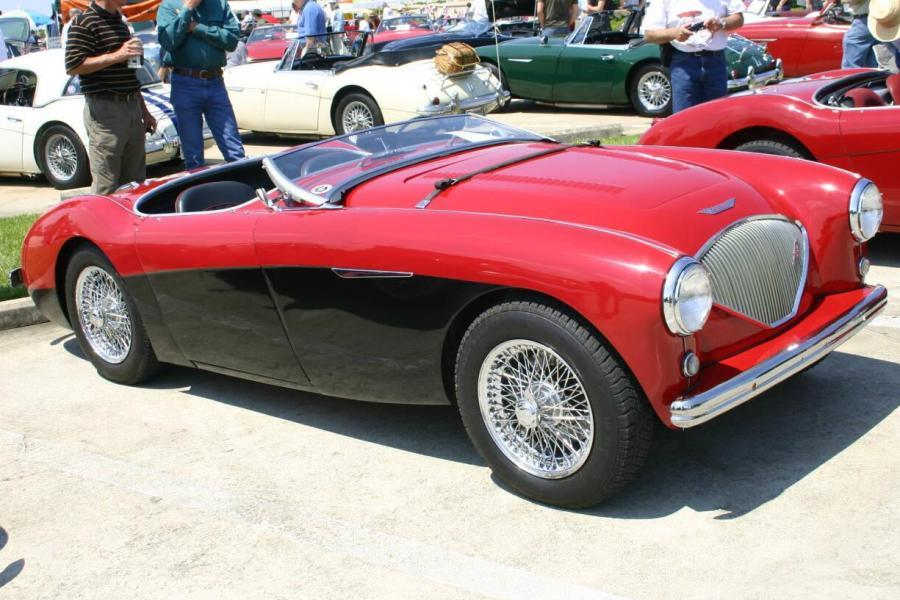
Austin-Healey 100M

So far the Healeys had all been expensive. Donald Healey wanted to produce a comparatively inexpensive sports car with 100 mph performance. He developed the Austin-Healey 100 using an Austin instead of the Tait developed Riley 2.5-litre engine and gearbox displaying it first at the October 1952 Earls Court motor show in London. The Morris-Austin merger had brought on BMC's decision to phase out the (Morris) Riley unit. His new factory, Cape Works, could not supply the demand so instead the Austin-Healeys were manufactured under a licensing arrangement by British Motor Corporation at their Longbridge works. A total of 74,000 Austin Healey 100s were built, more than 80% for export.

At that time Nash and Austin were working together on the project which became their Metropolitan

== Healey Automotive Consultants ==
Donald Healey formed a design consultancy in 1955, one of the results was the Austin-Healey Sprite which went into production in 1958.

== Jensen-Healey ==
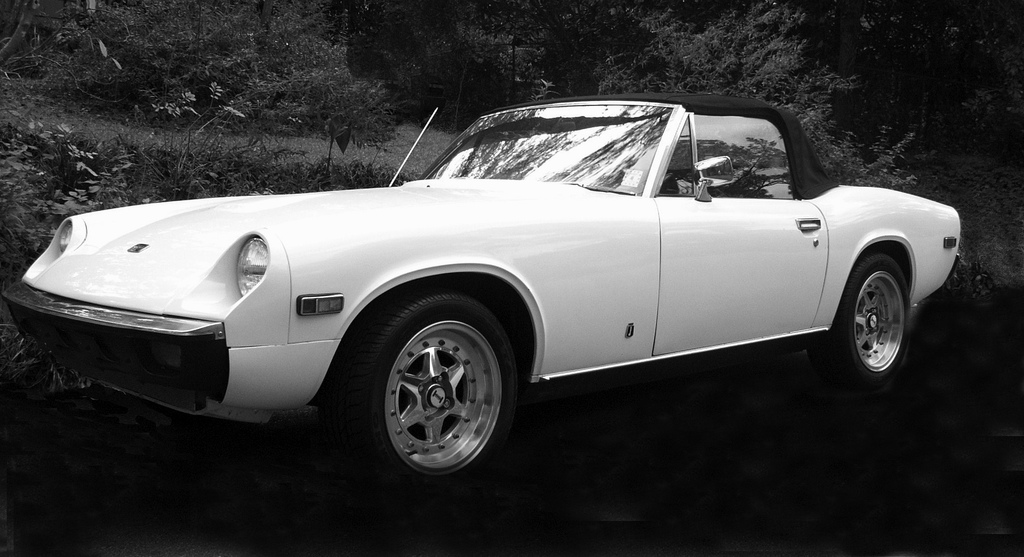
Jensen-Healey 1972–1976

The production arrangement with BMC ended in 1967. In 1970 Healey became chairman of Jensen Motors with the enthusiastic backing of key US based Austin-Healey distributors. This was a long and fruitful relationship for Healey, in part because Jensen had been making body shells for Austin-Healey since the 1952 demise of the similar Austin A40 Sports. Healey's first project with a Jensen was re-engineering the Jensen 541S with a V8 engine in 1961, the resulting car being a personal favourite of Healey's. Ten years later, Healey helped design the Lotus engined Jensen-Healey together with Lagonda designer William Towns, to replace the Austin-Healey, which BMC were discontinuing.

He designed this new Jensen-Healey using Vauxhall running gear and prototyped it using Vauxhall and Ford engines, which either had insufficient power, did not fit the sloping bonnet, or were unable to comply with the emission standards set in place in USA. Ultimately, he settled on the all-aluminum 4-valve, twin overhead cam Lotus 907

He resisted offers from Saab and Ford to produce a new sports car.

== Later life ==
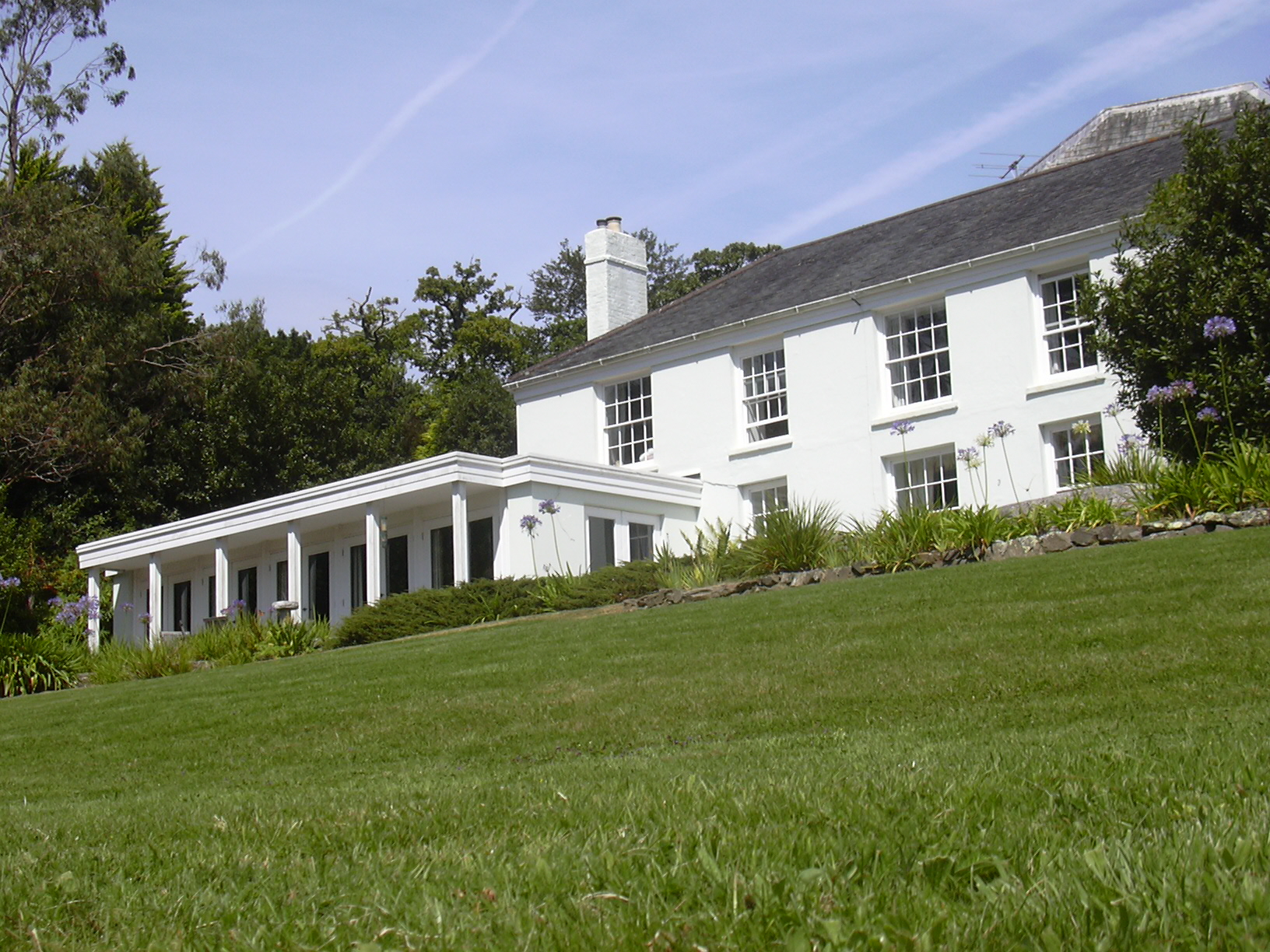
Trebah

He bought the 27 acres (11 ha) Trebah Estate, near Falmouth, Cornwall in 1961 and carried out many ambitious projects there, including the building of commercial greenhouses to grow orchids and a project to build air/sea rescue inflatables. He demolished the concrete covering of the beach of Polgwidden Cove (a D-Day invasion launch-pad) and used the salvaged material to surface a steep track from the house to the beach. (Hibbert, 2005). He sold Trebah in 1971. His son, Geoffrey, born in 1922 and a former pupil of Warwick School, wrote several books about the cars and one about their partnership (see below).

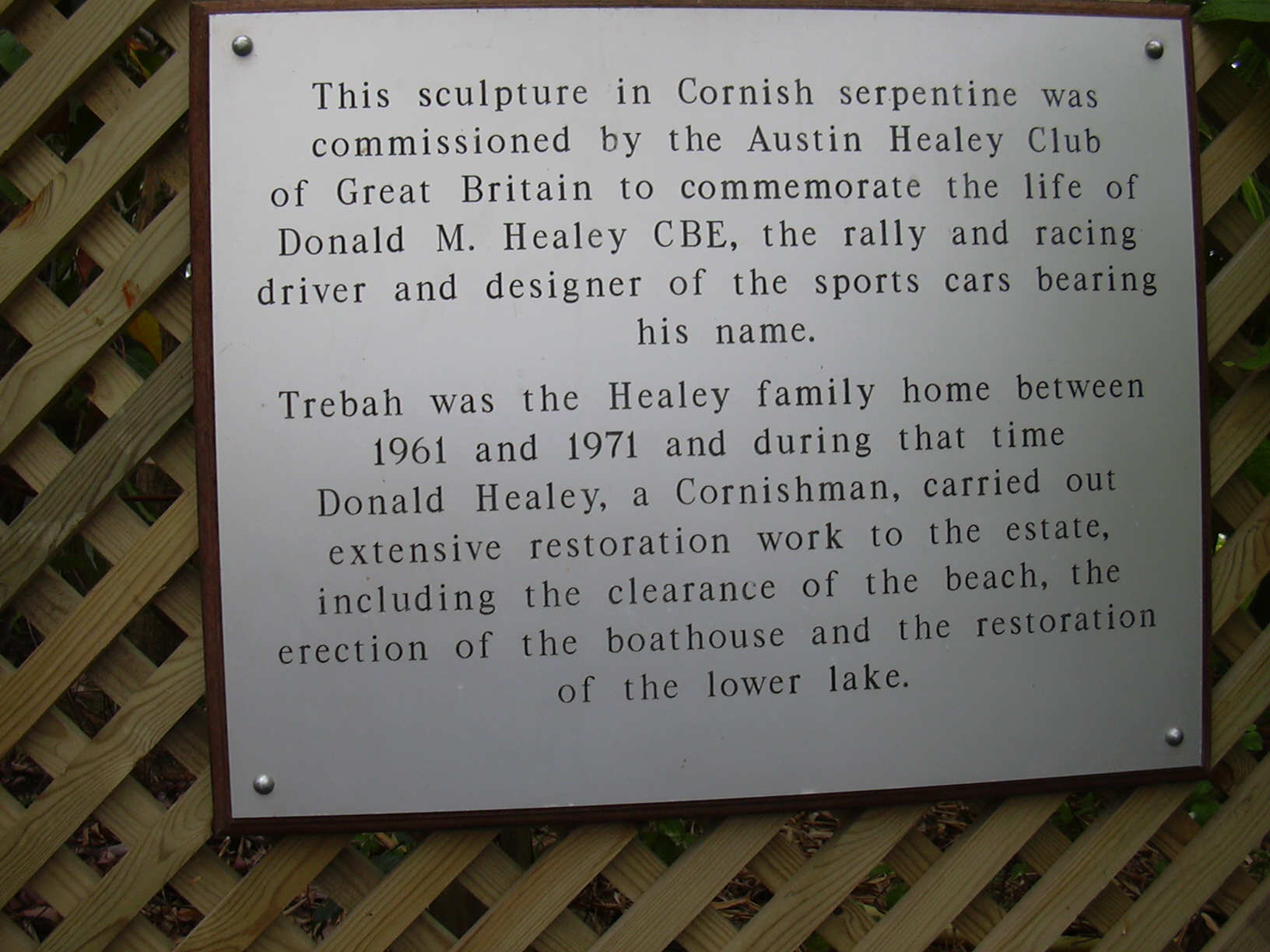
Plaque describing and explaining Donald Healey Memorial at Trebah Gardens

Donald Healey died in Truro at the age of 89. A memorial window in St Michael's Church Perranporth was provided by the Austin-Healey Club of America. The Austin Healey Club has also placed a small monument, in the form of a sports car, and an inscribed plaque, as a memorial to Donald Healey, next to the Visitor Centre in the garden of Trebah which is now open to the public.

His obituary in The Times reported that Healey was a small rotund man with a flashing smile and that he kept himself immensely fit, and had been, in his day, an expert water skier.

== Recognitions ==
- In 1962 he received the Médaille de l'Éducation Physique et des Sports (1ère Cl.) in Monaco.
- For his "services to export", Healey was made a Commander of the Order of the British Empire (CBE) by Queen Elizabeth II in 1973.
- In 1996, he was inducted into the International Motorsports Hall of Fame.
