= Valfried Zethrin =

Valfried (Val) Zethrin (12 April 1902 – January 1987) was a scion of a Prussian-Swedish family. Having originally fled social unrest in Prussia in the early 19th century the family settled in Stockholm, Sweden, before moving to London, England in 1870. Val's early life was largely uneventful, though his godfather, the adventurer and gentleman racer Arthur Andrews, was responsible for his passion for motor racing. The two families had originally met socially in London and holidayed together in the pre-war years at Sandown, IOW. At the age of 16 Val was bought a commission in the London Regiment, though was subsequently Gazetted in 1929 for bankruptcy. His godfather arranged for him to assist at motor racing events, notably Brooklands. It was here, whilst lap charting in July 1935 that he first met Adrian Squire, and was introduced to the notable Squire sports car. Upon his Bankruptcy discharge in 1936 he persuaded his godfather to finance the purchase of a long-chassis VDP tourer, and in short order bought the entire stock of parts when the Squire Car Manufacturing Company was placed in Voluntary liquidation the next year. The prewar period was difficult for Val Zethrin, being only able to sell two of the remaining cars.

After the end of the war Val Zethrin pursued a new project, an updated and simplified attempt at the Squire concept, called the Zethrin Rennsport. The approach for this incorporated the Swedish concept of LAGOM which demands that engineering solutions be pared down to the minimum to deliver the functionality required. This resulted primarily in a simple execution of all the services required in the car, and necessitated a review of the exotic Anzani engine. The reliability and cost of the R1 Anzani engine had always been an issue when used in the Squire, and post-war conditions rendered it unthinkable. Through the good offices of the Allen-Bowden design company, contact was made with Donald Healey, who recommended using a souped up Riley Motor engine, as he had employed in the Healey-Abbott, with all-enveloping bodywork designed by Benjamin Bowden. This was derived from early work on the Veritas. Suspension and modified frame from the Riley stable retained the 102" wheelbase of the short chassis Squire, providing the back-bone for what was to be an interesting but doomed venture. 180 bhp from the heavily modified engine was forecast suggesting that the target 135 mph maximum speed was achievable. It seems that this project went little further than a road-going prototype with aerodynamic bodywork, though British driver Geoff Richardson was signed up to drive in competitions. Zethrin did not have the technical expertise of Adrian Squire, and failed to ensure sufficient industry interest in what seemed a flight of fancy, in an era of austerity. Lack of funds and backers falling away put paid to the Rennsport becoming available for purchase. There was a final glimmer, when Zethrin sold the remaining Squire in his possession to an American car dealer, Charles Davison, who was signed up to promote the Rennsport in The USA. No more was heard of the car until 2007, when the heavily damaged remnants of Val Zethrin's automotive property came to light, stored in a derelict coachhouse at Sandown, on the IOW.

In 1939 Val Zethrin married Bridget Cornelius, who was a prominent fashion model, and they had one son. They lived in a house in Chislehurst, Kent, where he worked on his cars in their garage.
