= Triumph Super 7 =

Triumph Super 7 and Super 8
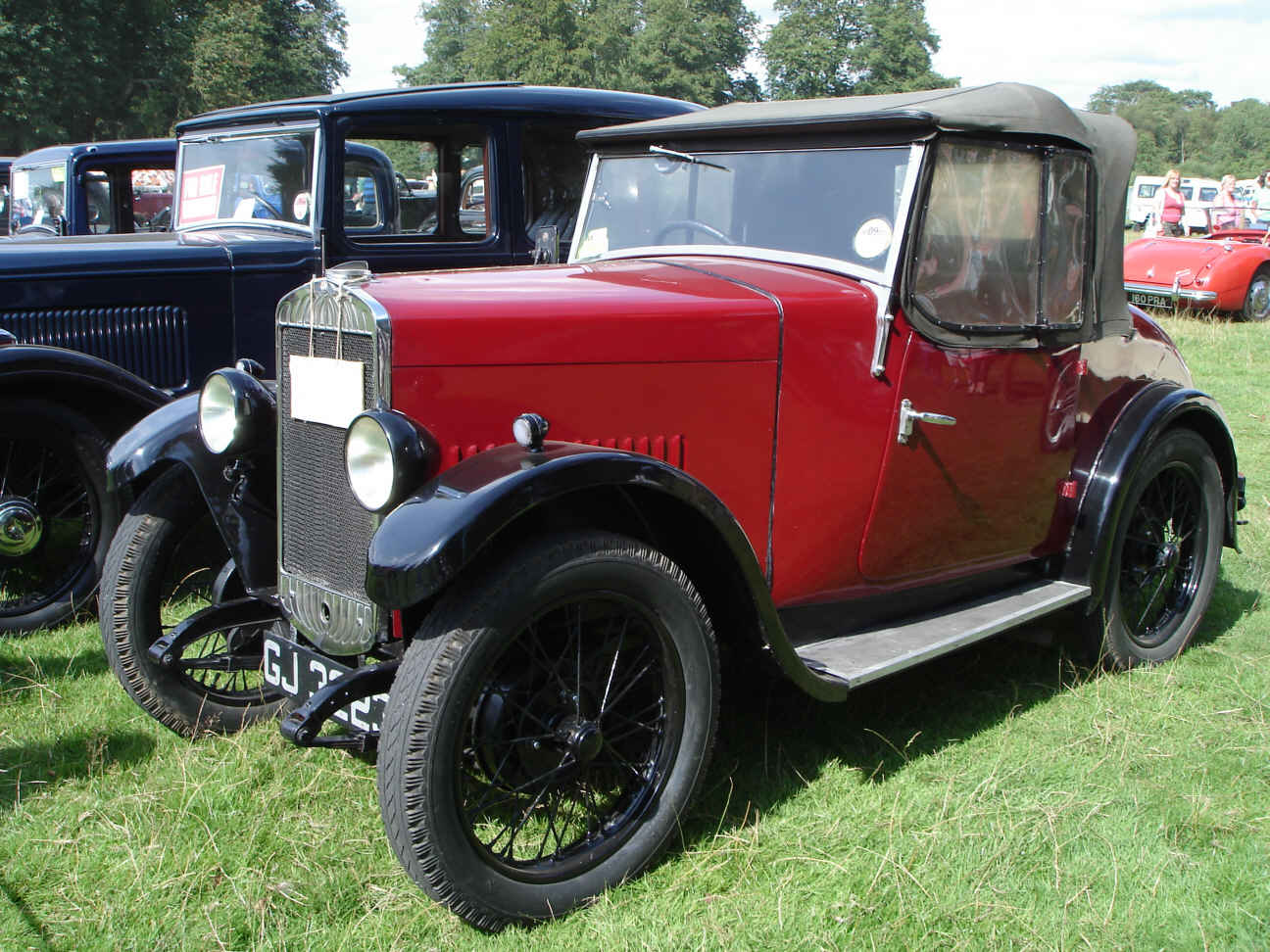

Overview
- Manufacturer: Triumph Motor Company
- Production: 1927–1934; 17000 made
- Designer: Arthur Sykes

Body and chassis
- Body style: four-seat tourer saloon fabric saloon 2-seat coupé

Powertrain
- Engine: 832 / 747 cc side-valve I4
- Transmission: Three-speed manual. Four speed from 1932.

Dimensions
- Wheelbase: 81 inches (2057 mm)
- Length: 96 inches (2438 mm)
- Curb weight: 1250 pounds, 570 kg (saloon)

Chronology
- Predecessor: none
- Successor: Triumph Super 9

The Triumph Super 7 is a car manufactured from 1927 until 1934 by the Triumph Motor Company. It was produced as a response to the success of the Austin 7 and was Triumph's first car to be made in large numbers. In 1933 the name was changed to the Triumph Super 8.

== Design ==
Development of the new car had started in 1925 when Arthur Sykes, who had been with Lea-Francis was given responsibility to design a new small car. Amongst those he recruited to help him was Stanley Edge, who had been the original draughtsman for the Austin 7. The car was launched in September 1927 and was 6 inches (150 mm) longer and 2 inches (50 mm) wider than the Austin. The new 832 cc 4-cylinder side-valve engine, mainly designed by Harry Ricardo, had a stroke of 83 mm (3.3 in) and bore of 56.5 mm (2.22 in) and unlike the Austin had a three bearing crankshaft with pressure lubrication and monobloc crankcase made from cast iron. (The Austin 7 had a two-bearing crankshaft and the cylinder block and crankcase were separate castings.) The car followed its Triumph predecessors by having Lockheed hydraulic brakes, but now they were internal expanding in 9.5 in (240 mm) drums and so less affected by water then the older external contracting type. The handbrake operated on the transmission.

The chassis had a rigid front axle supported by half-elliptic springs and a live rear axle with Austin 7-like quarter-elliptics, allowing the chassis side members to finish ahead of the rear axle. The three-speed non-synchromesh gearbox was mounted in unit with the engine and transmitted power to the worm gear final drive via a torque tube. The electrical system was 6 volts.

== Body styles ==
A range of body styles was offered, all made in house. The cheapest model was a two-door four-seat tourer, followed by a de-luxe tourer with two-coloured body, a two-seater with dickey seat, a two-door saloon, a fabric-bodied saloon and at the top of the range, a coachbuilt saloon. Gordon England could also supply a special fabric-bodied saloon with sliding roof. The chassis was also supplied to other coachbuilders for fitting their own bodies. Prices ranged from £113 for the chassis to £190 for the Gordon England saloon. On test the car could reach just over 50 mph (80 km/h) and return 40 miles per imperial gallon (7.1 L/100 km; 33 mpg_{‑US}).

== Model history ==
For 1929 a new body style was released called the Special Sports with pointed tail and there was also briefly a supercharged version with the engine capacity reduced to 747 cc and reputedly able to reach 80 mph (130 km/h), but it was expensive at £250, and few seem to have been sold. Also in 1929 Donald Healey entered a standard car in the Monte Carlo Rally, starting from Berlin but failing to finish, getting stuck repeatedly in the snow in France. Undeterred, he tried again in 1930 and was the first British car to finish and seventh overall, in a car with a top speed of 50 mph (80 km/h).

More body styles appeared in 1930 when a two-seat coupé, a de-luxe fabric saloon and a landaulet appeared. Wire wheels became standard replacing the artillery type that had been used on some versions. The extensive range was simplified for 1931 with the deletion of the fabric saloons, landaulet, coupé and Special Sport but a Gnat sports tourer and Tickford-bodied saloon were added.

With the deteriorating economic climate a further rationalisation of the range was carried out in 1932 with the cars being designated Mark I for the tourers and Mark II for the saloons. A pillarless saloon joined the range. The car's track grew from 42 to 43.5 inches (1105 mm), the rear springs were changed from quarter to semi elliptic on the Mk II Saloons, and the de-luxe models got a four-speed gearbox.

== The Super 8 ==
The name was changed in 1933 to the Super 8, the car had always technically fallen into the 8 hp taxation bracket, and all cars gained the Mk II chassis. The body range was further reduced to the two-door saloon, pillarless saloon and four-seat tourer. This was the last year for the car. Triumph had already launched the Super 9 in 1931, and this car was destined to be the replacement.

== Bibliography ==
- A-Z of cars of the 1920s. Nick Baldwin. Bay View Books. 1994 ISBN 1-870979-53-2
- The Story of Triumph Sports Cars. Graham Robson. Motor Racing Publications. 1972 ISBN 0-900549-23-8
- A-Z of cars of the 1930s. Michael Sedgwick, Mark Gillies. Bay View Books. 1989 ISBN 1-870979-38-9
- Pre 1940 Triumph Motor Cars from Family Photograph Albums. Graham Shipman. Pre 40 Triumph Owners Club. 2005 ISBN 0-9550422-1-6
- "Super Little Seven" Jonathon Wood. The Automobile, January 2000
