= Donald Healey Motor Company =

British carmaker

Donald Healey Motor Company Limited
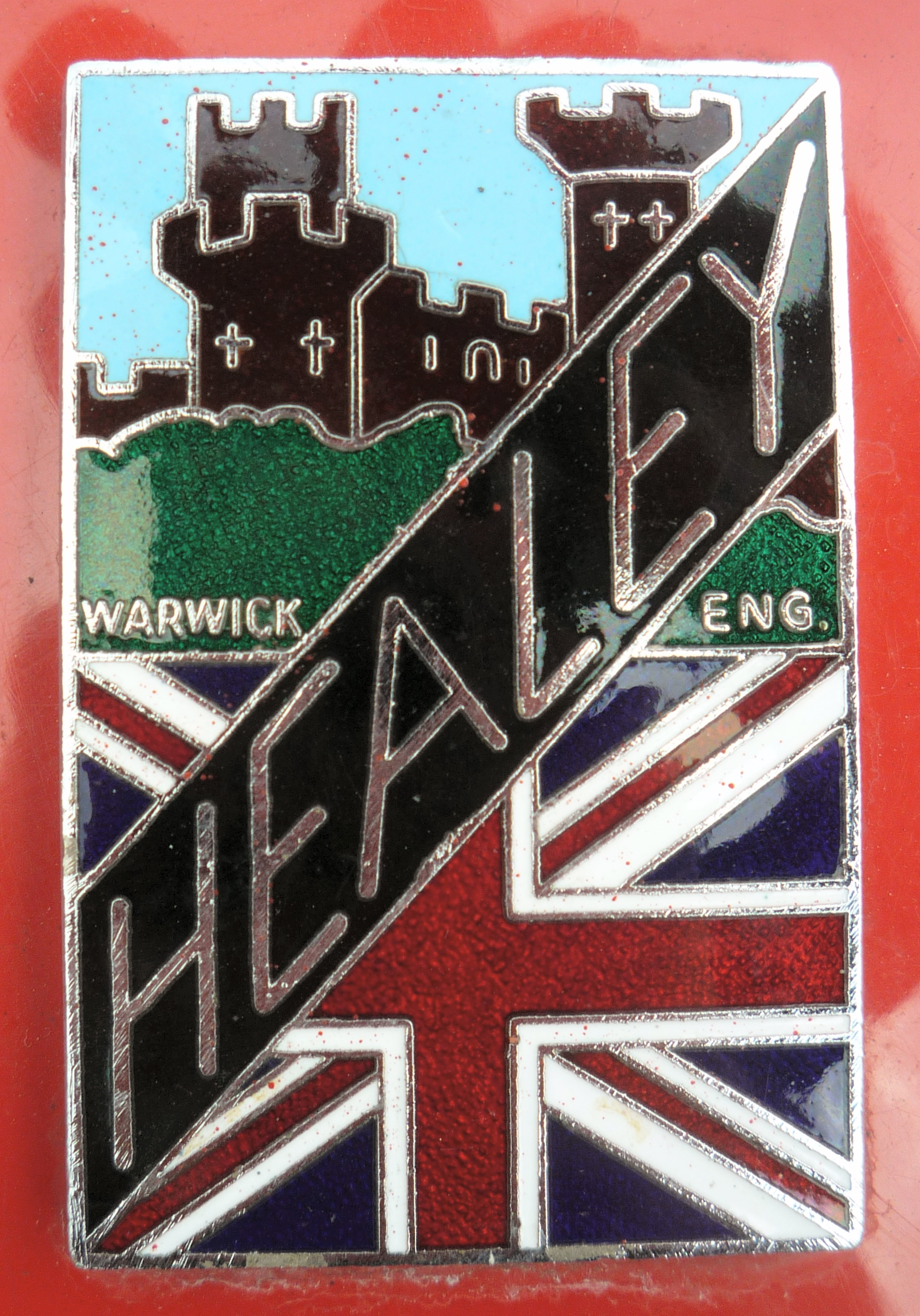
- Industry: Manufacture of high performance cars and design consultancy
- Founded: 13 February 1946
- Fate: Sold
- Headquarters: The Cape, Warwick; United Kingdom
- Key people: Donald Healey - founder

Donald Healey Motor Company Limited was a British car manufacturer. (Note: Incorporated 13 February 1946 company number 00404473, name changed 18 August 1997 and now Nick Whale Stratford Limited. New company 02249335 incorporated 28 April 1988 and since 18 August 1997 named Donald Healey Motor Company Limited)

== History ==
The business was founded in 1945 by Donald Healey, a successful car designer and rally driver. Healey discussed sports car design with Achille Sampietro, a chassis specialist for high performance cars and Ben Bowden, a body engineer, when all three worked at Humber during World War II.

== Healey motorcars ==
Healey's new enterprise focused on producing high-quality, high-performance cars which were inevitably expensive. It was initially based in the premises of Benford Ltd (who made cement mixers and dumpers) at The Cape in Warwick, but soon moved into an old aircraft components factory on the adjacent Millers Road Industrial Estate. There Healey was joined by Roger Menadue from Armstrong Whitworth to run the experimental workshop and subsequently by his son Geoffrey, who had qualified as an engineer. On 3 July 1963 (not 1961 as is often stated) they moved again into the former Warwick Cinema at Coten End. Both these premises have now been demolished: a block of flats has been built on the cinema site, called – much to Geoff's disgust – 'Healey Court'. The cars mainly used a tuned version of the proven Riley twin-cam 2.4-litre four-cylinder engine in a light steel box-section chassis of Healey design using independent front suspension by coil springs and alloy trailing arms with Girling dampers. The rear suspension used a Riley live axle with coil springs. The suspension design allowed soft springing to be combined with excellent road holding. Lockheed hydraulic brakes were used.

When it was introduced in 1948, the Elliott saloon was claimed to be the fastest production closed car in the world, timed at 104.7 mph over a mile. The aerodynamic body design was the work of Benjamin Bowden and unusually for the time it was tested in a wind tunnel to refine its efficiency. This was the start of Healey's aerodynamic styling for reduced drag, that culminated in Bowden's last UK offering, the Zethrin Rennsport. In 1949 the most sporting of all the Healeys, the Silverstone, was announced. It had a shorter chassis and stiffer springing and was capable of 107 mph. It is now a highly sought after car, and many of the other remaining Healeys have been converted into Silverstone replicas. These cars had numerous competition successes including class wins in the 1947 and 1948 Alpine rallies and the 1949 Mille Miglia.

=== Nash-Healey ===
Government planning and controls in this time period required any substantial expansion of production to be for the export market alone. So in 1950 Healey entered the North American market with the Nash-Healey, using a Nash Ambassador engine with SU carburettors and Nash gearbox. Initially the Ambassador's 3848 cc engine was used, but when in 1952 body construction was transferred from Healey to Pininfarina the larger 4138 cc engine was fitted.

=== Production numbers ===
The final Healey car of this era was the G-Type, using an Alvis TB21 engine and gearbox. This was more luxurious (and heavier) than the Riley engined models, and performance suffered.

Type	Engine	Approx Production	Year
Healey Westland Roadster	2443 cc Riley 4 cylinder	64	1946-50
Healey Elliott Saloon	2443 cc Riley 4 cylinder	101	1946-50
Healey Sportsmobile	2443 cc Riley 4 cylinder	23	1948-50
Healey Silverstone	2443 cc Riley 4 cylinder	104	1949-50
Healey Tickford Saloon	2443 cc Riley 4 cylinder	222	1950-54
Healey Abbott Drophead Coupe	2443 cc Riley 4 cylinder	77	1950-54
Nash-Healey	3848 or 4138 cc Nash 6 cylinder	506	1950-54
Healey G-Type Roadster	2993 cc Alvis 6 cylinder	25	1951-53

Riley engined cars

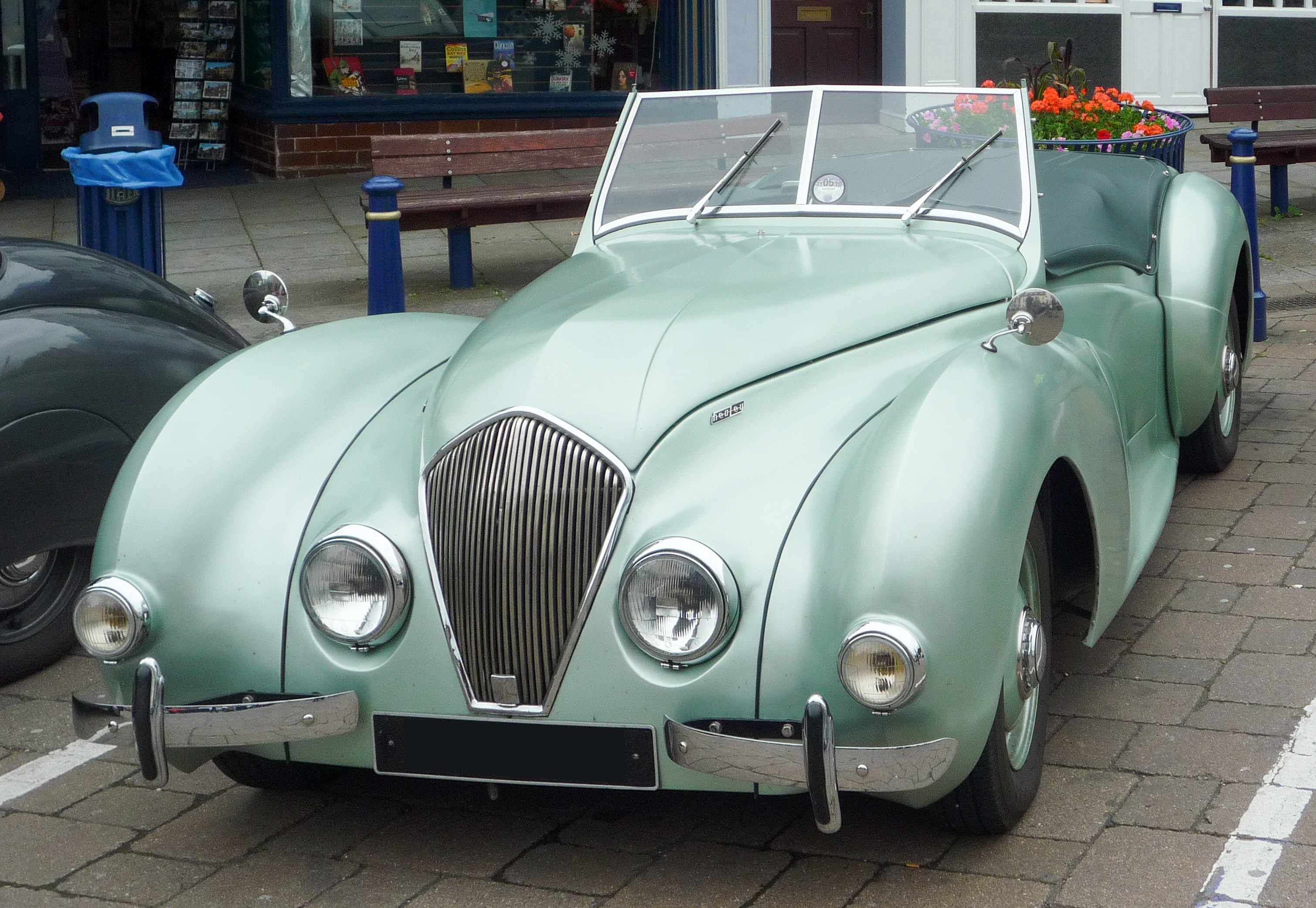
Westland
roadster
1949 example

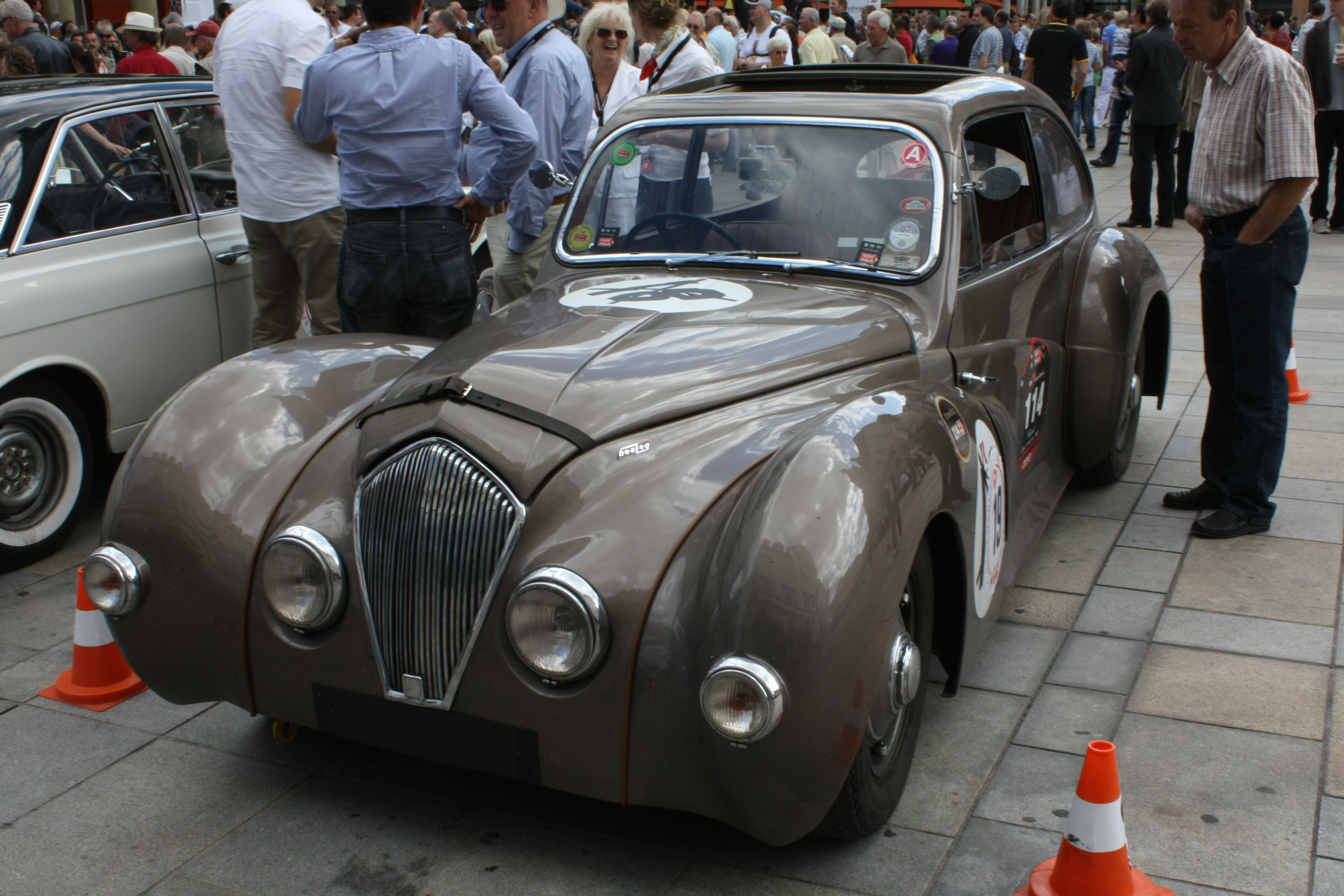
Elliott
saloon

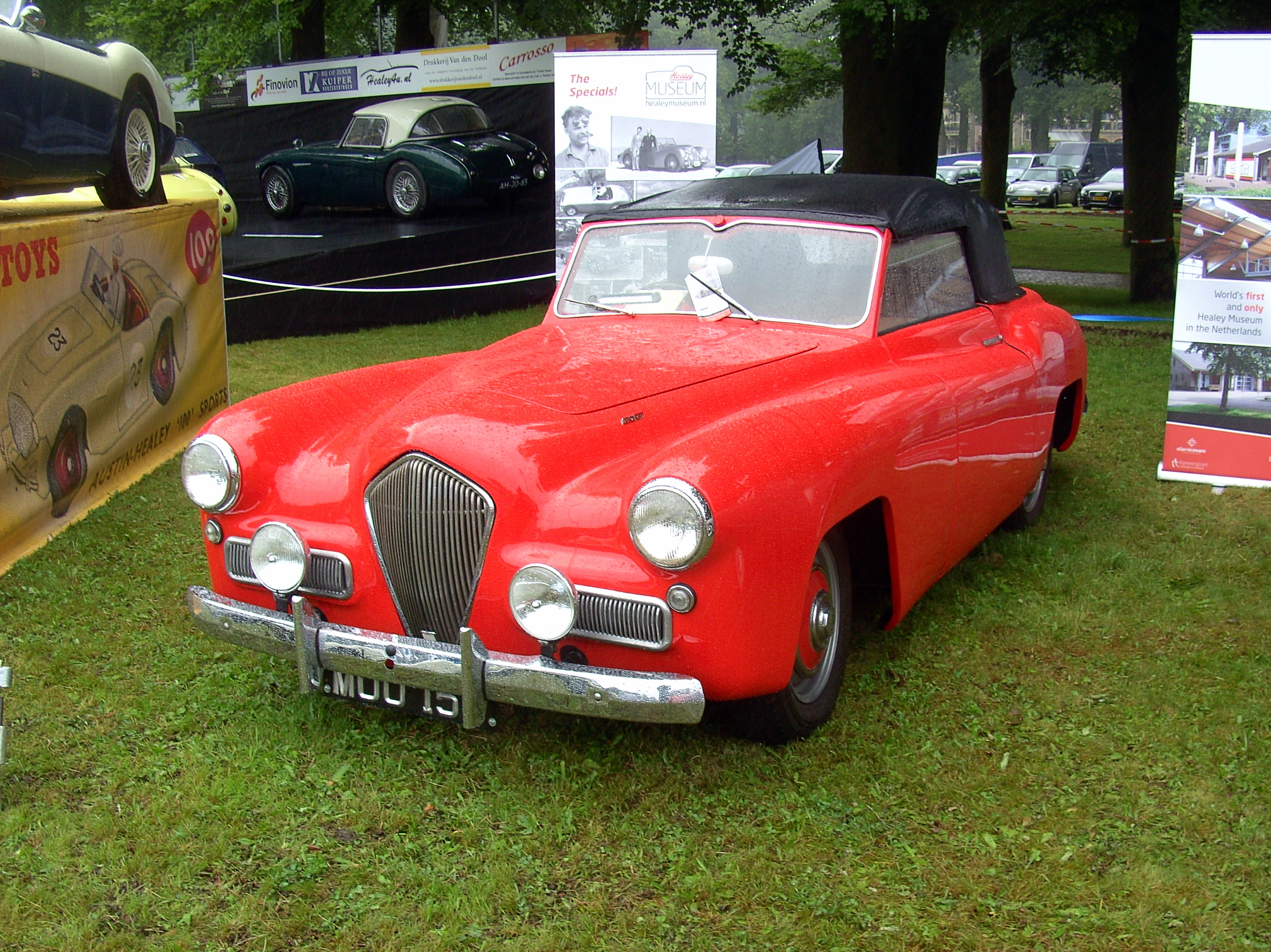
Sportsmobile
roadster
1947 example

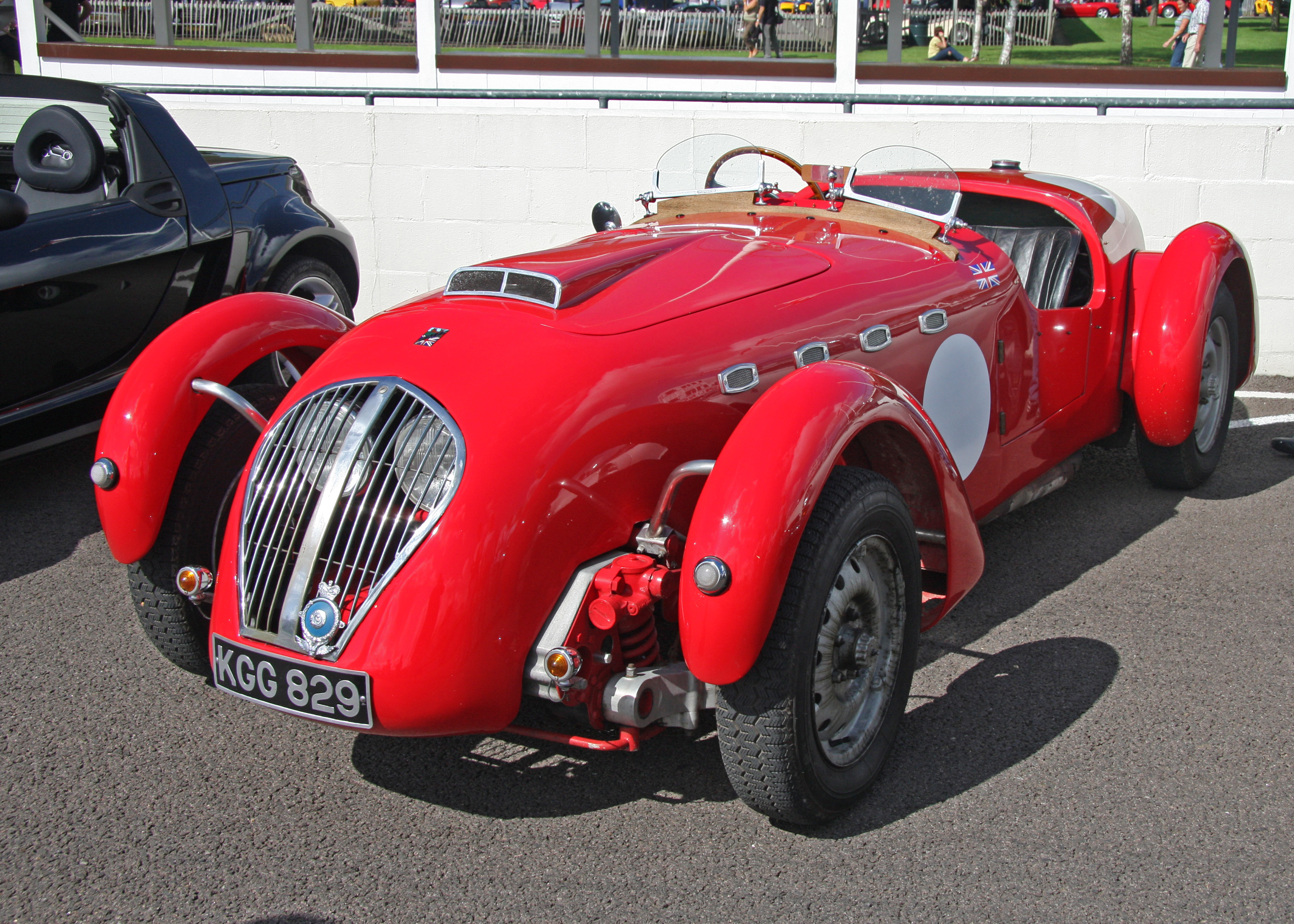
Silverstone
roadster
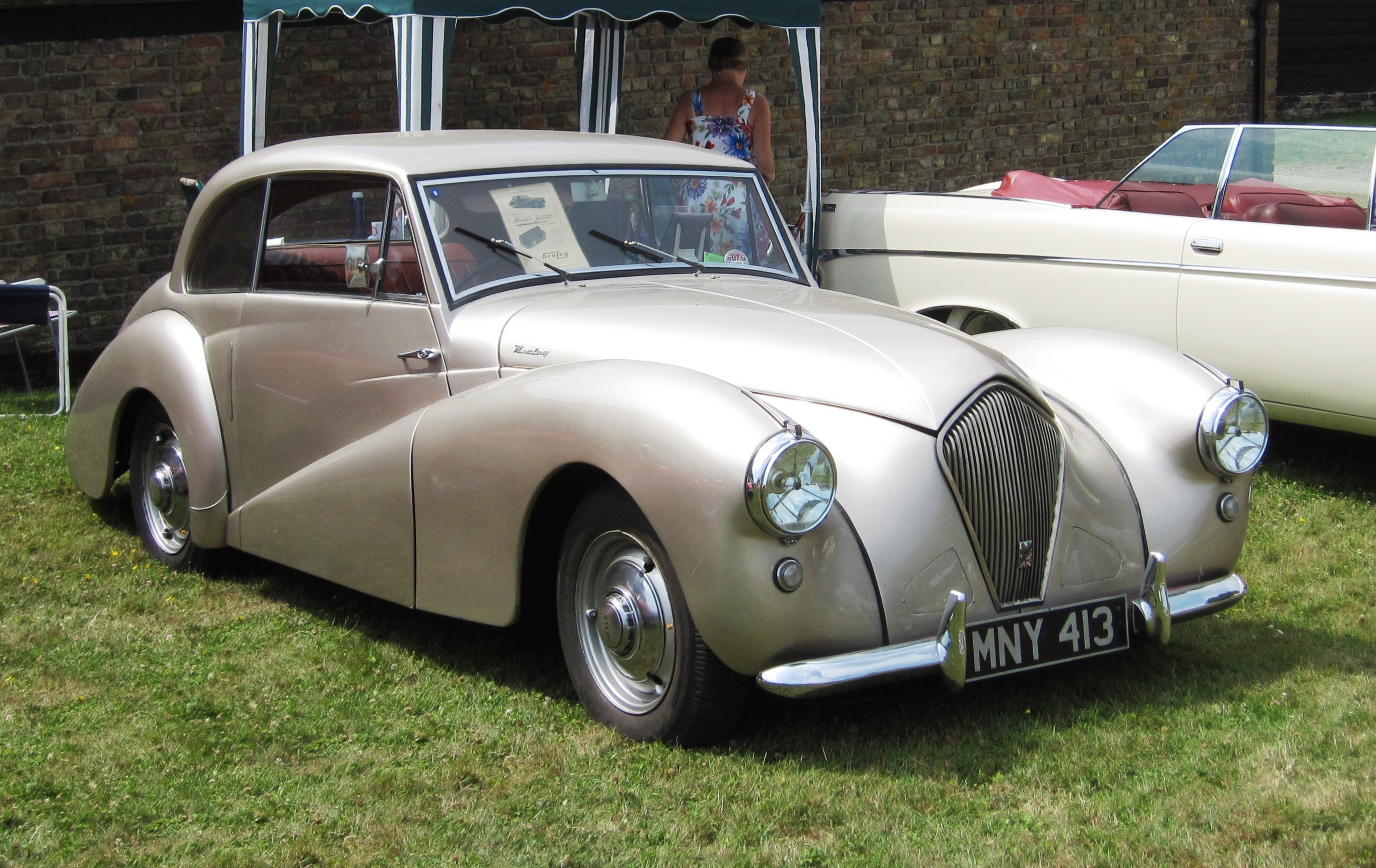
Tickford
2-door saloon
1953 example

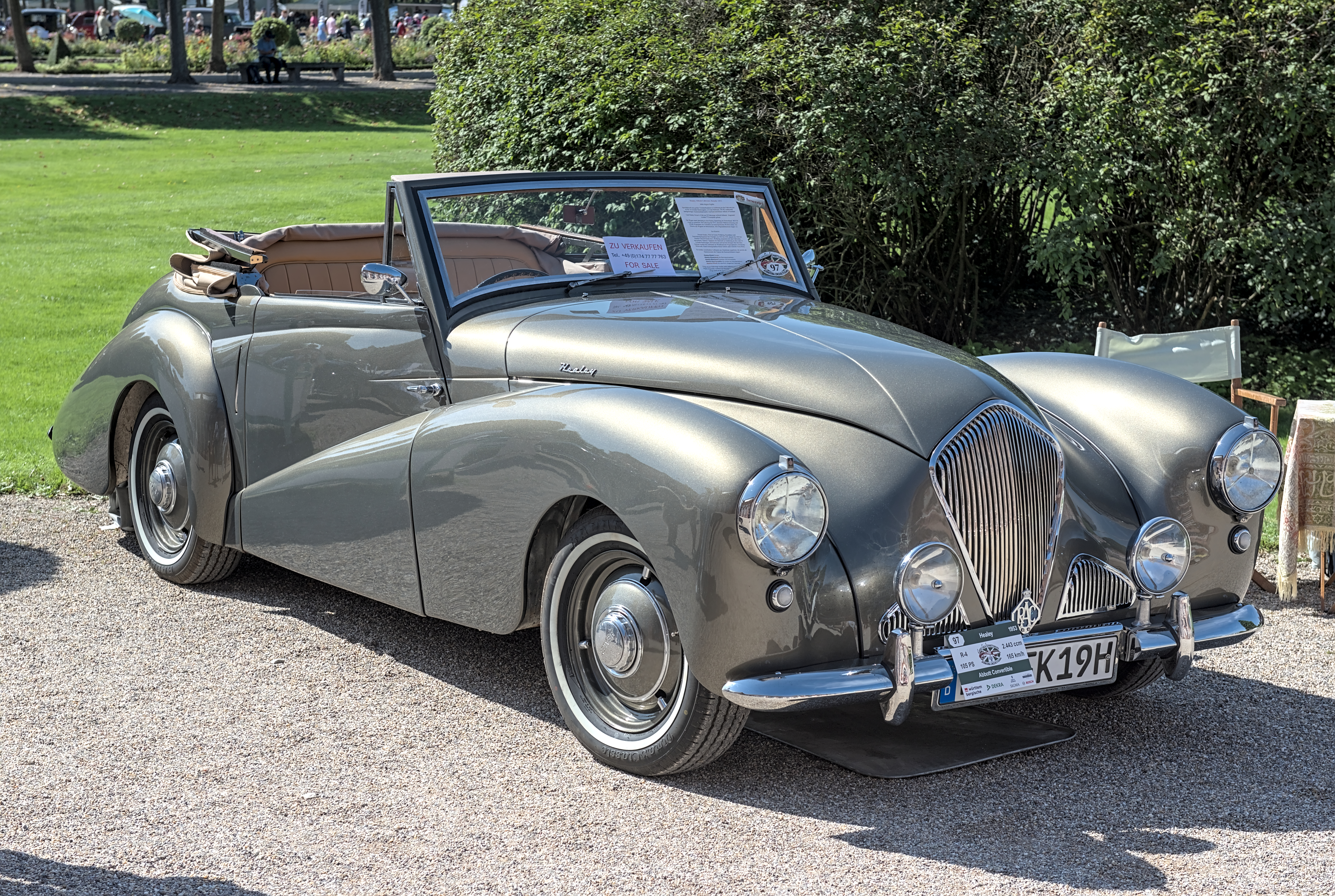
Abbott
drophead coupé
1952 example

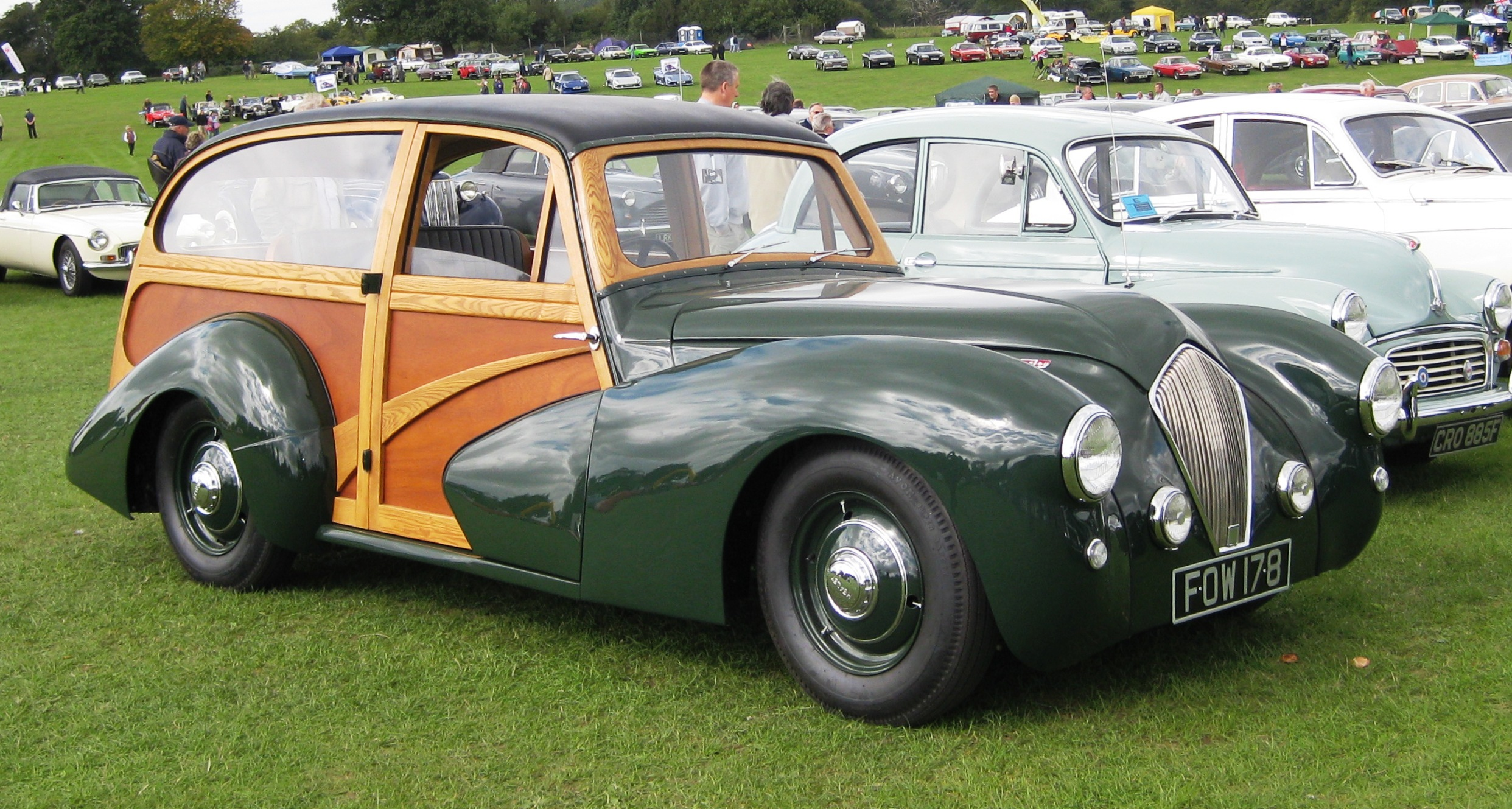
Westland
"Woody" brake
(ca 1950)
Nash and Alvis engined cars

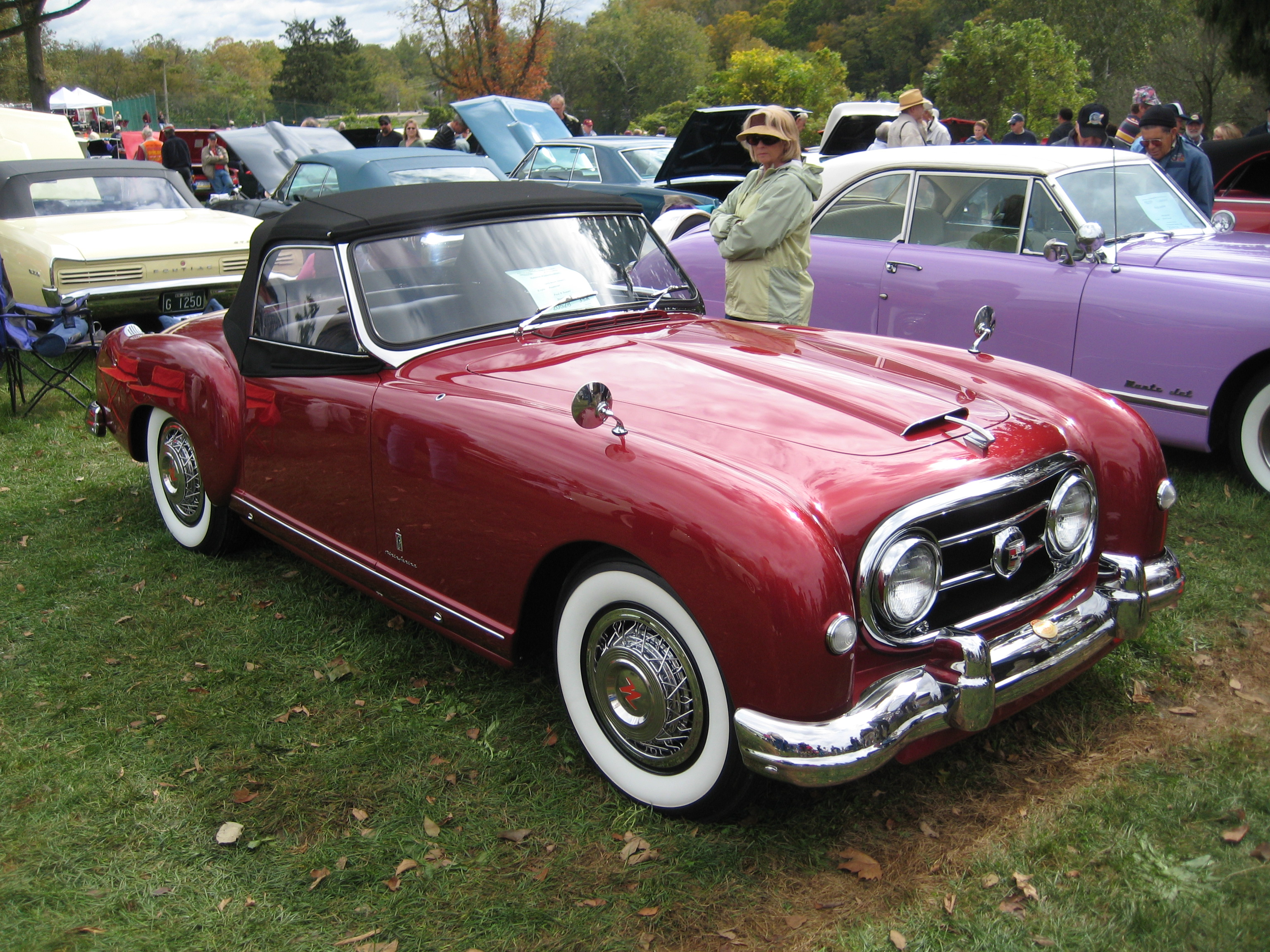
3.8-litre roadster
Nash Ambassador engine

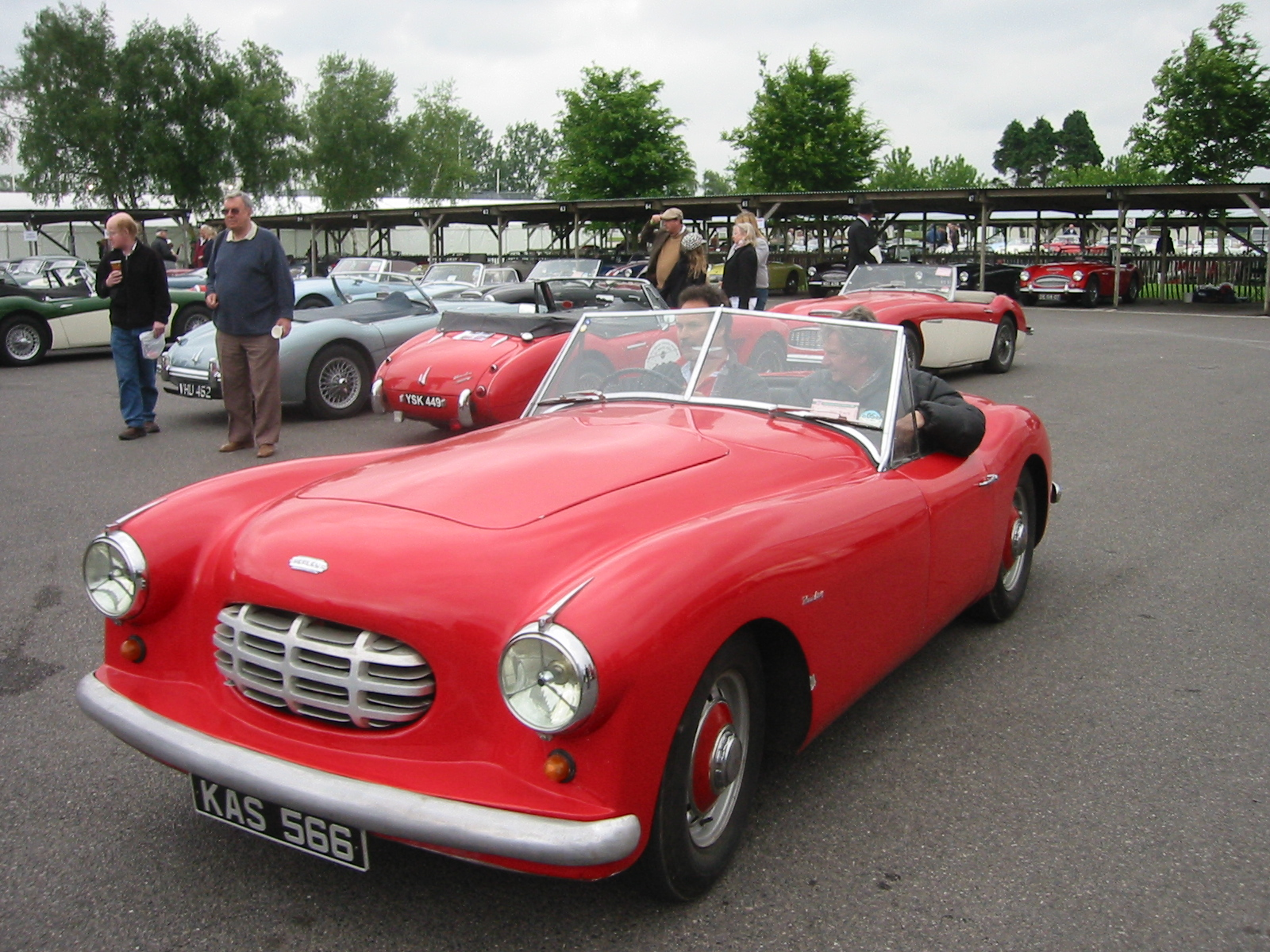
G type roadster
3-litre Alvis engine

== Austin-Healey ==
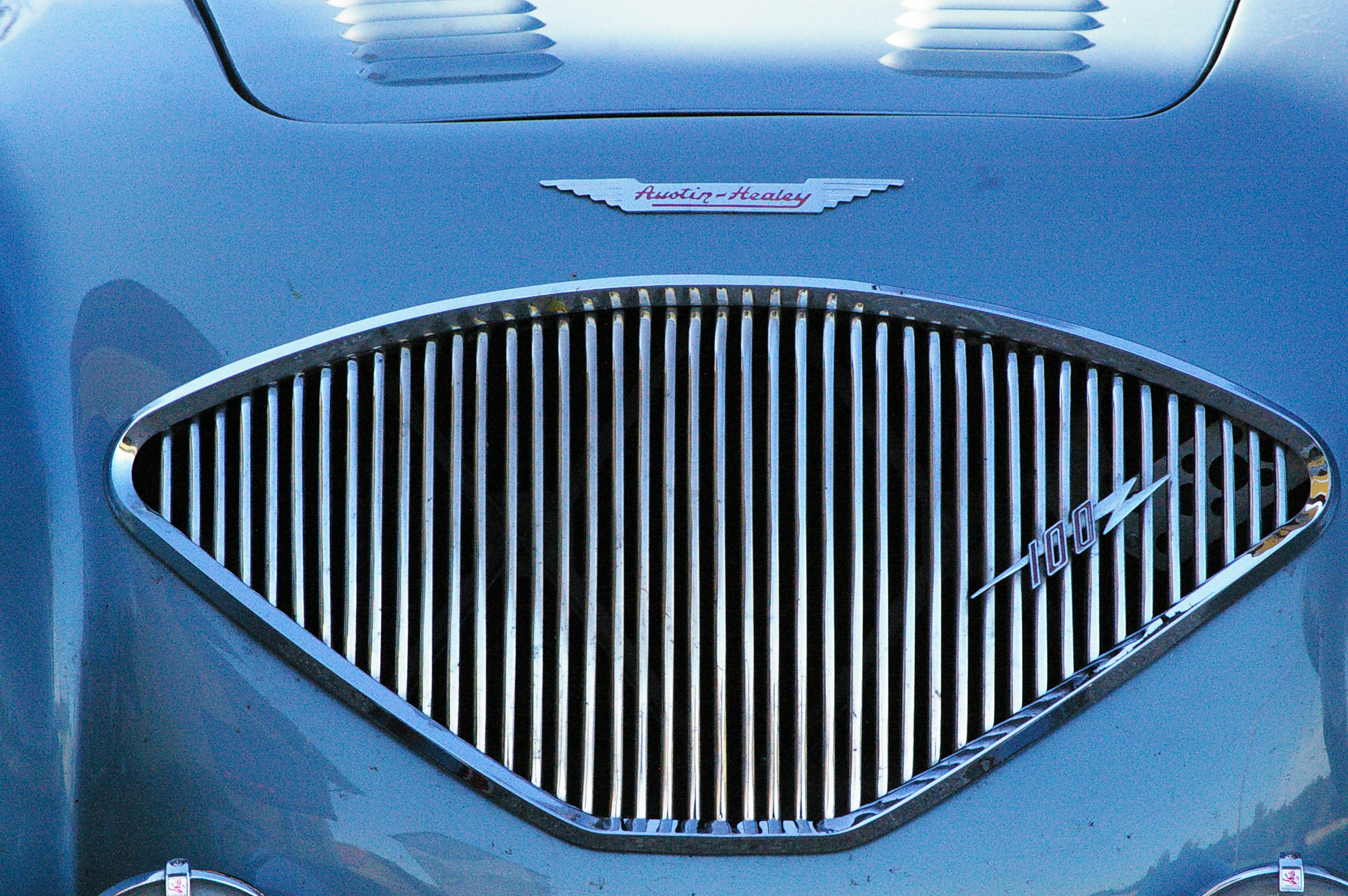
Healey's signature grille fanned out for the Austin-Healey 100

Healey judged a cheaper sports car marketable in large numbers was needed to save the business, one that would fit between the MG and Jaguar cars then selling so well in USA. Working with his eldest son Geoffrey in the attic of the family home, Healey designed a two-seat roadster employing numerous low-cost Austin components, the Healey Hundred. Austin chief Sir Leonard Lord was so impressed when he saw it on the Healey stand at the 1952 Earls Court Motor Show he offered to make it in his own factories under the name Austin-Healey 100.

The result was a 1953 a joint venture which created the Austin-Healey marque with the British Motor Corporation manufacturing the cars and the Healey company doing the designs and running racing operations. The 100 evolved into the highly regarded and collector coveted 3-litre Austin-Healey 3000, and the diminutive 950cc Austin-Healey Sprite, known affectionately as the "frog-eye" or "Bugeye" was also manufactured.

Commenting on the 3000 after Donald Healey's death The Times observed: "The big Healey's brutally firm ride, heavy steering and engine so close it would roast a driver's feet never detracted from the superb, timeless styling and classic proportions."

== Jensen-Healey ==
Donald Healey became a director of Jensen Motors in the late 1960s and a result of this was the Lotus-engined Jensen-Healey which appeared in 1972.

== Sale ==
Donald Healey Motor Company was finally sold to the Hamblin Group, although Healey Automobile Consultants and the engineering parts of the company remained in the hands of Geoffrey and Donald Healey.

== See also ==
- List of car manufacturers of the United Kingdom
