= Bicycle Heaven =

Transportation museum in Pennsylvania, US

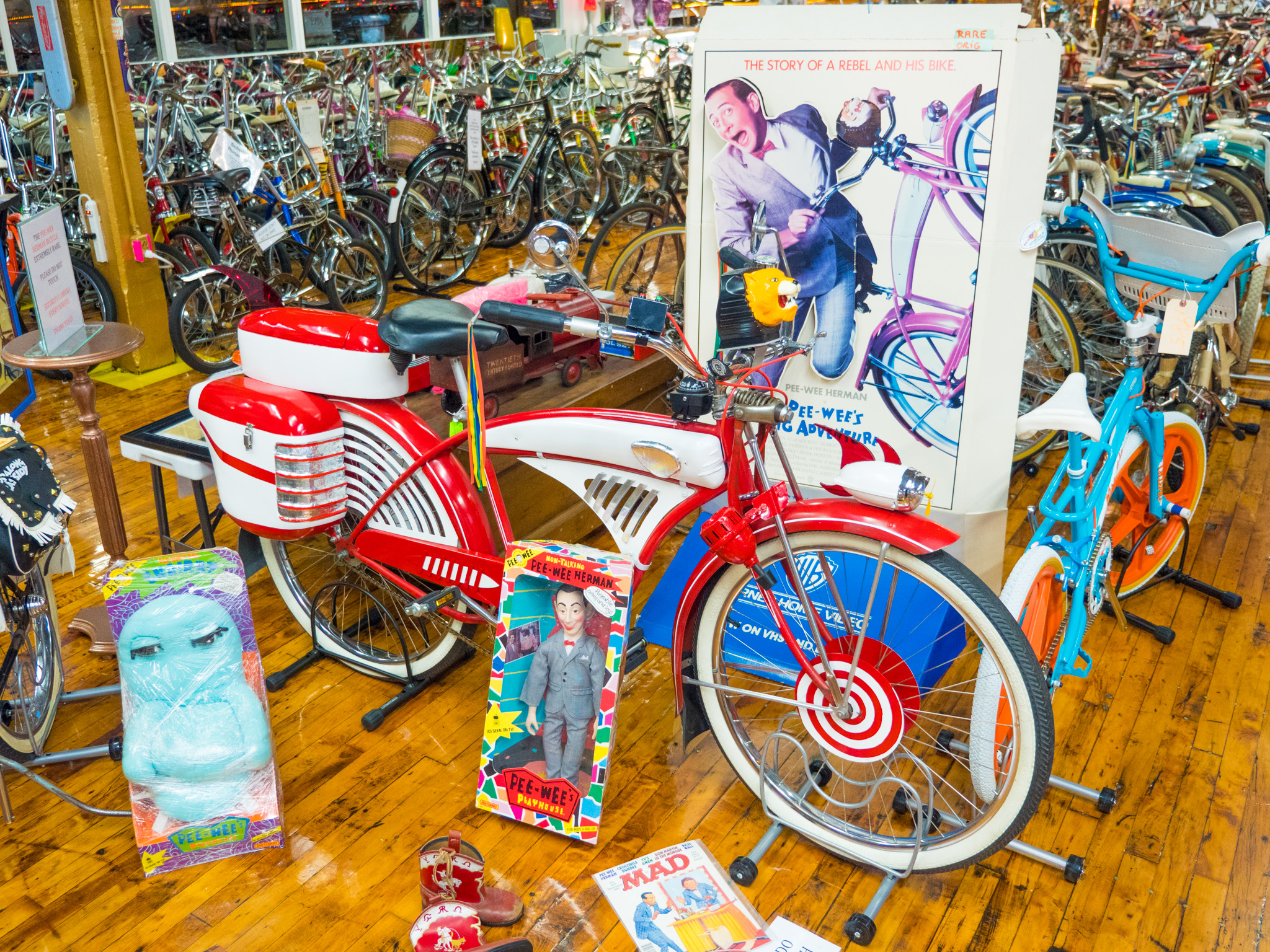
- One of the prop bicycles used in Pee-wee's Big Adventure on display

- Location in Pittsburgh
- Established: July 2, 2011
- Location: Casey Industrial Park; 1800 Preble Ave; Pittsburgh, PA 15233
- Coordinates: 40.456139°N 80.032190°W
- Type: Transportation museum
- Founder: Craig Morrow
- Director: Henry Morrow
- Parking: On site (no charge)
- Website: bicycleheaven.org

Bicycle Heaven is the largest transportation museum in the world dedicated to bicycles. The museum was founded by Craig Morrow and comprises his personal collection gathered over decades. It is located in Pittsburgh, Pennsylvania.

The museum is an active collection. The 650 m^{2} show room contains over 3,500 bicycles with an additional 27,000 in storage. There are over 100,000 parts to keep the collection in repair.

Bicycle Heaven also serves as a bike shop, and consults as prop agents for film, television and theatrical productions. After filming, the bicycles are returned and become part of the permanent collection.

== History ==
Bicycle Heaven was founded in 2011.

== Exhibits ==
=== Bowden Spacelanders ===
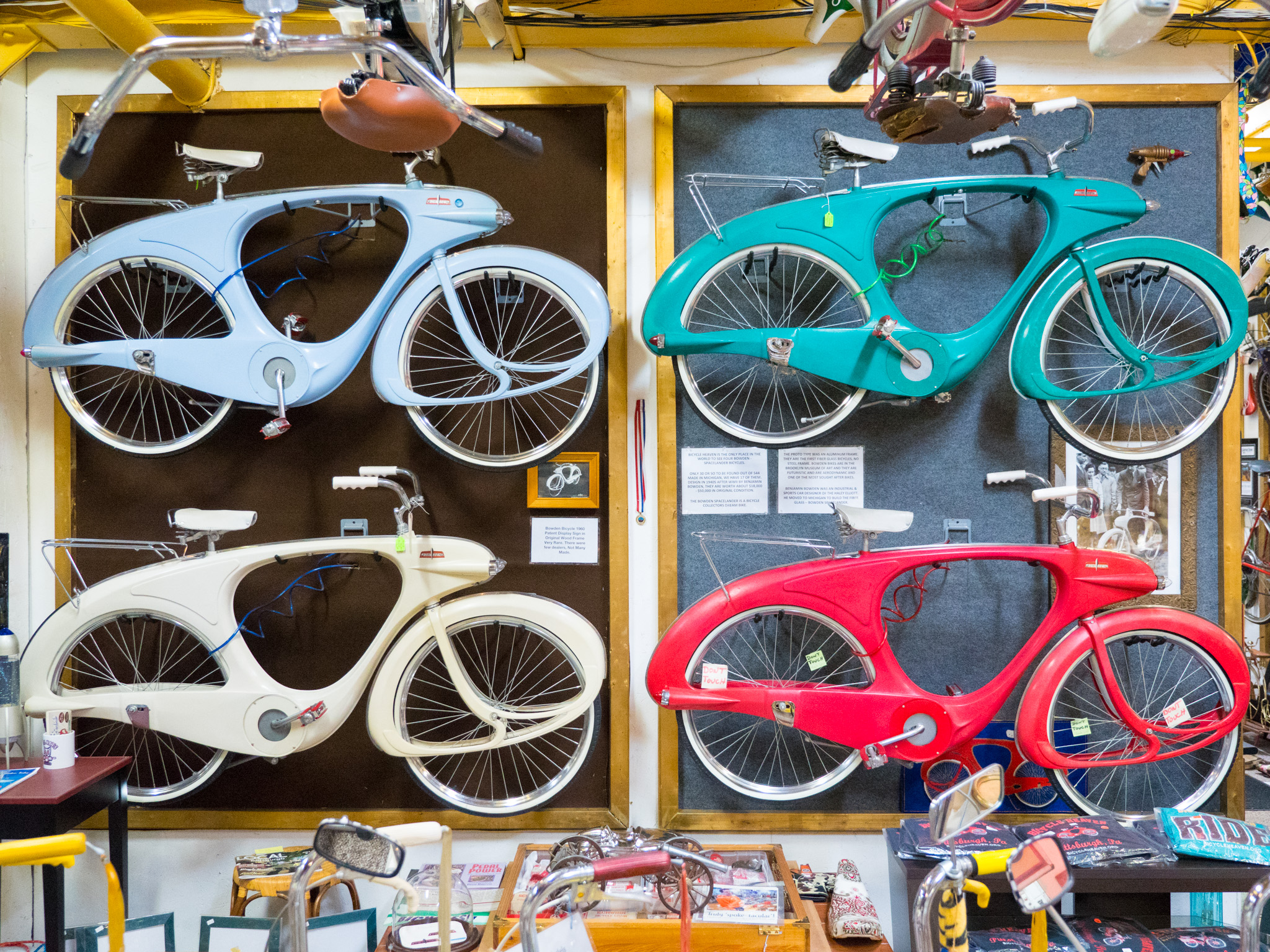
Four of the last Bowden Spacelanders

Benjamin Bowden, a British industrial designer, designed a space-age fiberglass bicycle in 1946. Bowden named the design the Spacelander; it entered production in 1960 and sold for $89.50. Only 522 Spacelander bicycles were made in the original run. By the 1990s only a few dozen were estimated to have survived. Morrow collected 17 of the proposed 38 left in the world. The Bowden Spacelanders are some rarest bicycles in the museum. Given their scarcity and good condition, they are valued over $50,000 each.

=== Pee-Wee Herman's Bicycle ===
One of the jewels of the museum is one of the prop bikes used as Pee-wee Herman's bicycle, the MacGuffin of the film Pee-wee's Big Adventure.

=== Other Movie Bicycles ===
The museum displays bicycles used in the films A Beautiful Mind, Fences, Super 8, and others.
