= Benjamin Bowden =

British industrial designer

- Born: Benjamin George Bowden; 3 June 1906; North Kensington, London, England
- Died: 6 March 1998 (aged 91); Lake Worth, Florida, U.S.
- Education: Polytechnic Regent Street
- Occupations: Designer and engineer
- Known for: Bicycle and automobile design

Benjamin George Bowden (3 June 1906 – 6 March 1998) was a British industrial designer, who is known mostly for his work on automobiles and bicycles. Bowden designed the coachwork of Healey's Elliott, an influential British sports car. He was also the designer of the Spacelander, a space-age bicycle which was commercially unsuccessful when in production, but has since become a collector's item.

== Early life and career ==
Bowden was born in North Kensington, London on 3 June 1906. He received violin training at Guildhall, and completed a course in engineering at Regent Street Polytechnic.

== Automobile design ==
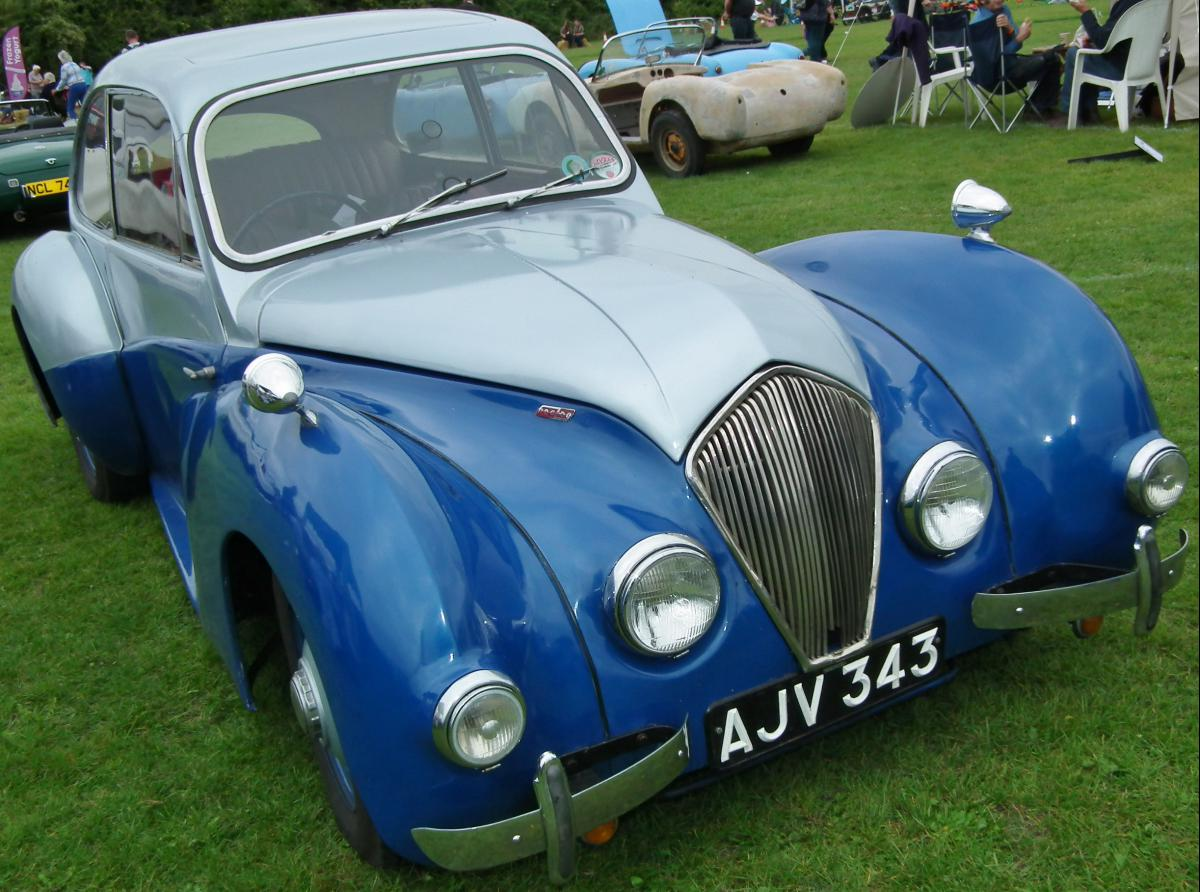
A 1948 Healey Elliott, designed by Bowden

In 1925 Bowden began working as an automobile designer for the Rootes Group. By the late 1930s, Bowden was chief body engineer for the Humber car factory in Coventry. During World War II, he designed an armored car which was used by Winston Churchill and George VI.

In 1945, he left the Rootes Group and formed his own design studio in Leamington Spa with partner John Allen. The studio was one of the first such design firms formed in Britain.

Bowden designed the body of Healey's Elliott, which, in 1947, was the first British car to break the 100 mph barrier. Working with Achille Sampietro who created the chassis, Bowden drew the initial design for the auto directly onto the walls of his house. Shortly before his departure to the United States Bowden penned a sketch design for a two-seater sports racing prototype, the Zethrin Rennsport, being developed by Val Zethrin. This used the same wheelbase as the short-chassis Squire Sports, and was dressed in a contemporary all-enveloping streamlined body. This design theme was carried through to his subsequent work on the early Chevrolet Corvette and Ford Thunderbird.

== Bicycle design ==
=== The Classic ===
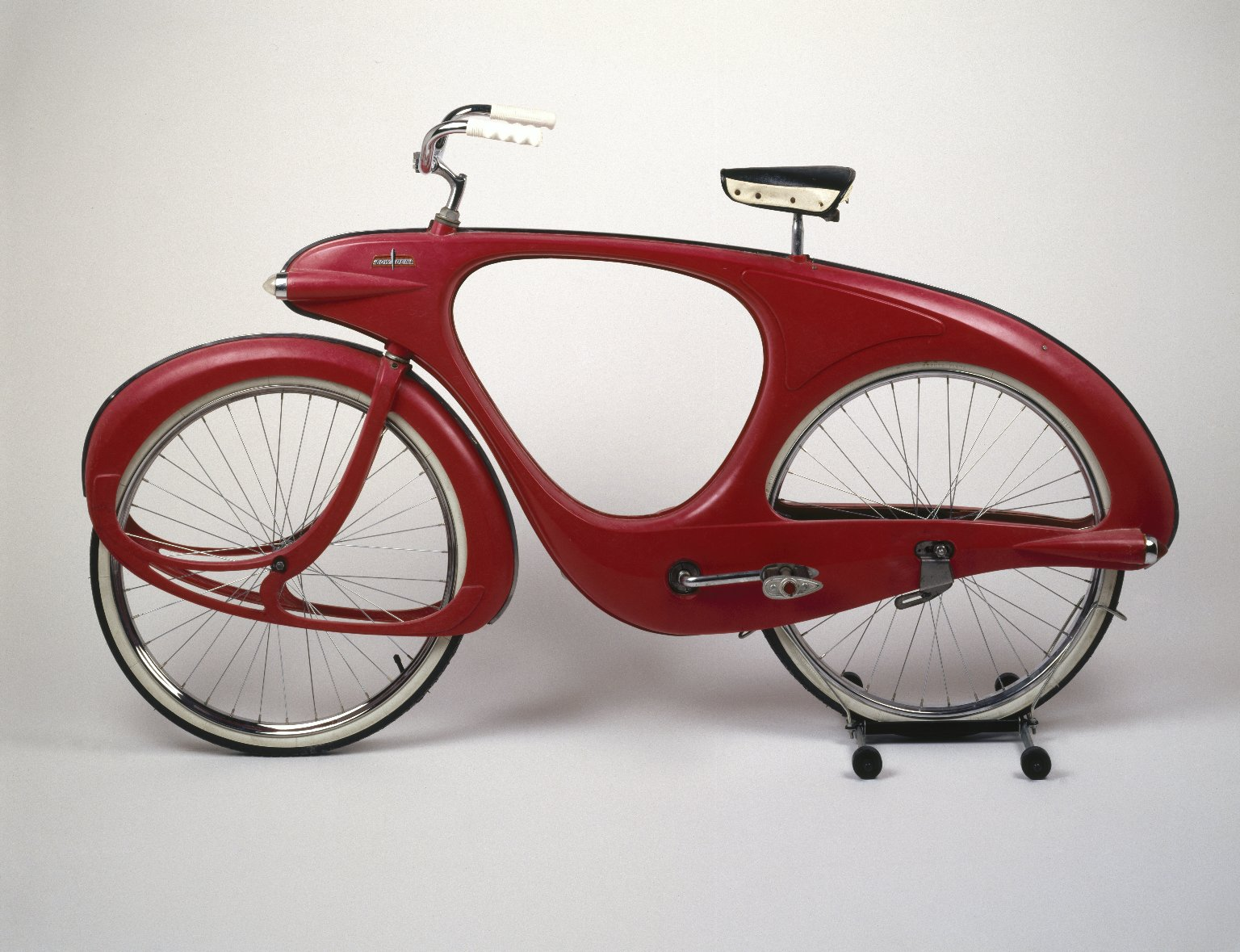
The Bowden Spacelander bicycle, prototype designed in 1946; manufactured 1960. Brooklyn Museum

For the 1946 exhibition Britain Can Make It, Bowden submitted a design for a highly streamlined bicycle which he named the Classic. The bicycle was constructed of pressed aluminium and featured a driveshaft and a hub dynamo that stored energy when riding downhill and gave a boost when riding uphill. Although the bicycle's unusual appearance created substantial public interest initially, British bicycle makers were reluctant to invest in the high degree of re-tooling needed to manufacture the bicycle. In 1949 Bowden pursued the possibility of having the Classic manufactured in South Africa, but, according to Bowden, abrupt changes in South African import policy prevented that plan from materializing.

=== The Spacelander ===
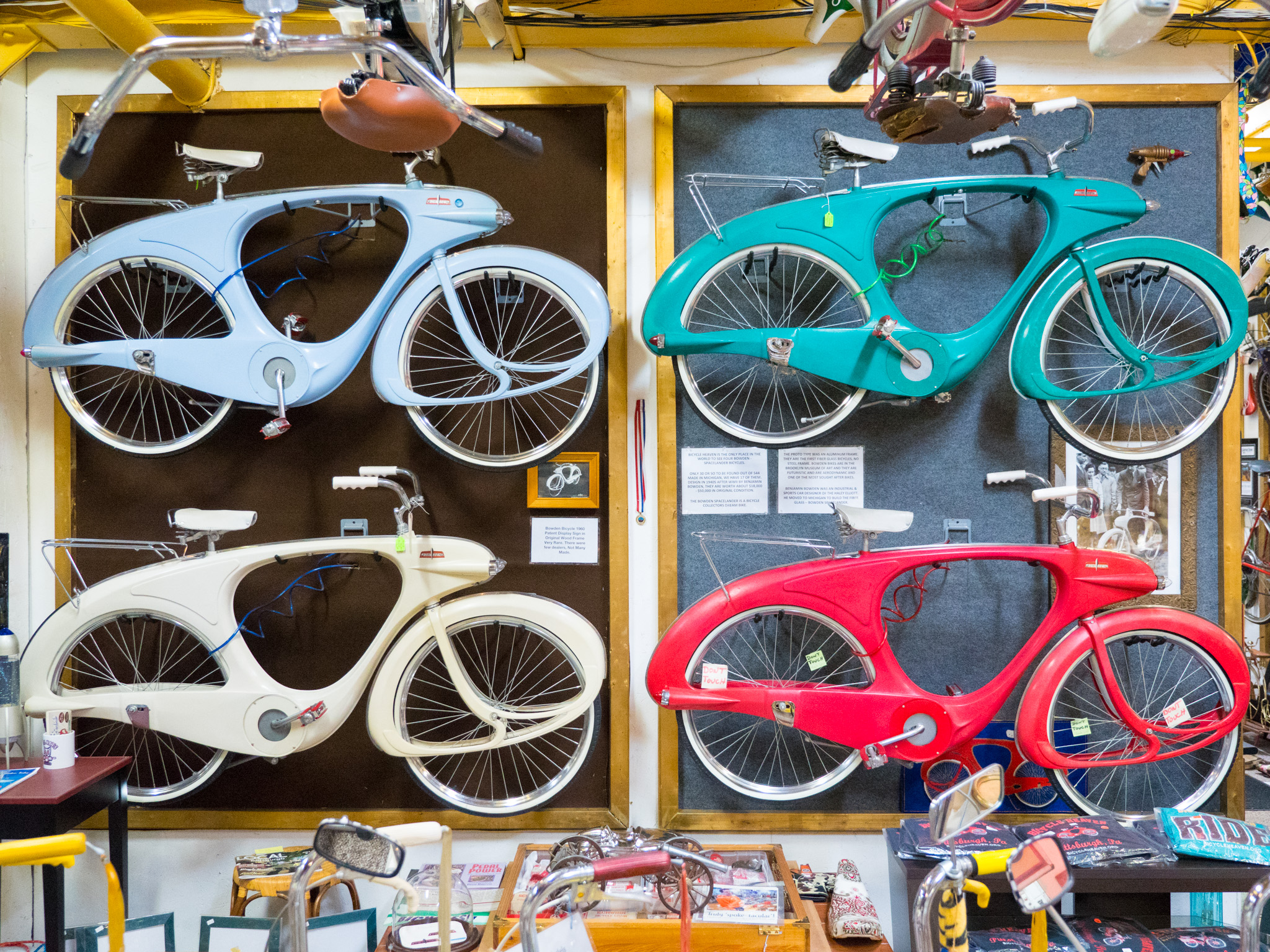
Multicolored Bowden Spacelanders on display at Bicycle Heaven

In 1952 Bowden emigrated to Windsor, Ontario before moving to the United States. While in Muskegon, Michigan in 1959, he met with Joe Kaskie, of the George Morrell Corporation, a custom molding company. Kaskie suggested molding the bicycle in fibreglass instead of aluminium. Although he retained the futuristic appearance of the Classic, Bowden abandoned the hub dynamo, and replaced the drive-train with a more common sprocket-chain assembly. The new name, Spacelander, was chosen to capitalize on interest in the Space Race. Financial troubles from the distributor forced Bowden to rush development of the Spacelander, which was released in 1960 in five colours: Charcoal Black, Cliffs of Dover White, Meadow Green, Outer Space Blue, and Stop Sign Red. The bicycle was priced at $89.50, which made it one of the more expensive bicycles on the market. In addition, the fibreglass frame was relatively fragile, and its unusual nature made it difficult to market to established bicycle distributors. Only 522 Spacelander bicycles were shipped before production was halted, although more complete sets of parts were manufactured.

Bowden designed a third iteration of the bicycle, called the 300, but only a small number of prototypes were ever made.

Beginning in the 1980s, there was a resurgence of interest in the Spacelander as a collector's item. Two bicycle enthusiasts, John Howland and Michael Kaplan, purchased the rights to the Spacelander name from Bowden, and have manufactured a small number of reproductions and replacement parts. The first reproduction was sold in 1988 for $4,000. The reproduction's design has been modified to improve durability.
