= Triumph 10/20 =

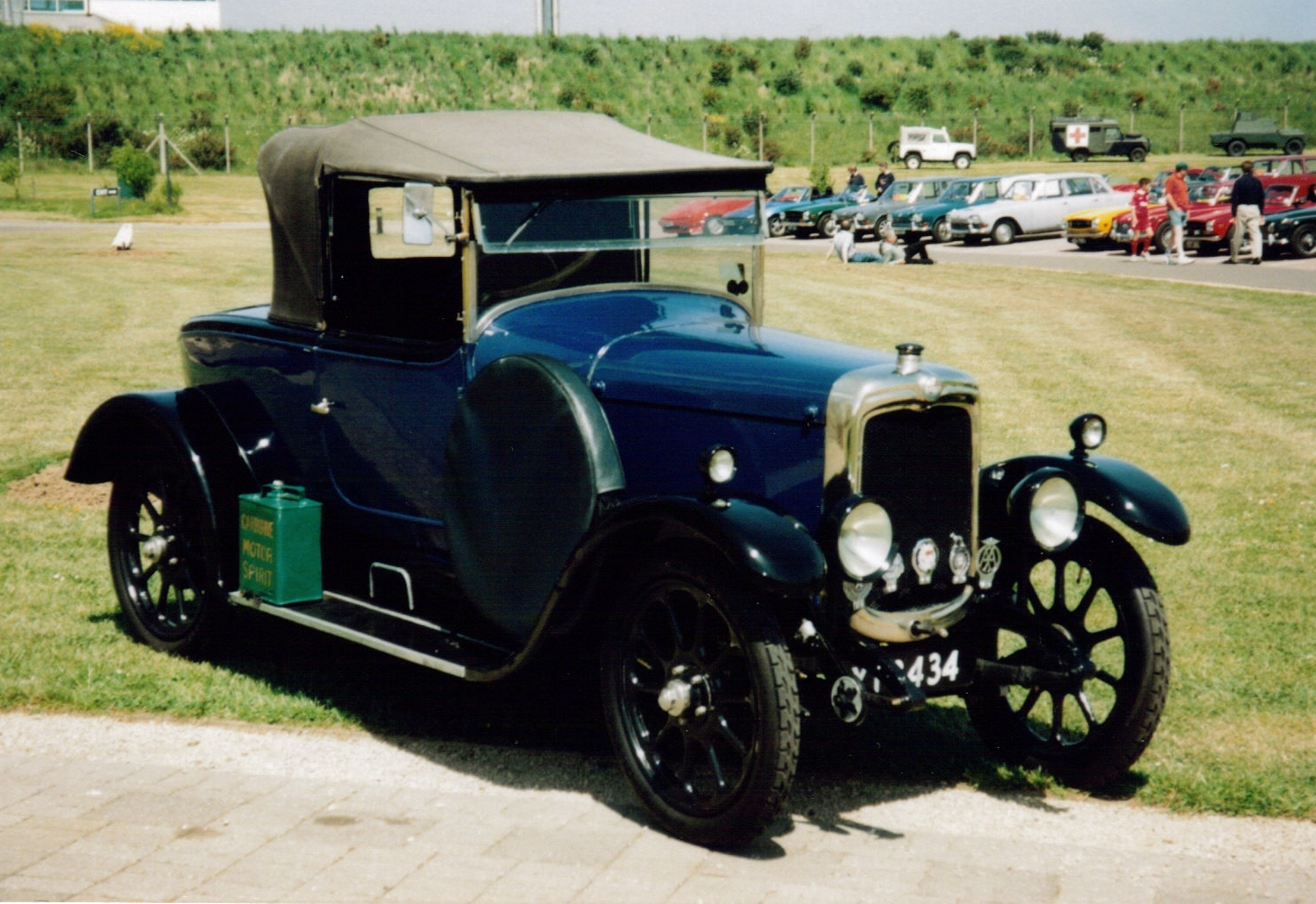

Overview
- Manufacturer: Triumph Motor Company
- Production: 1923–26; 2500 made (see text)

Body and chassis
- Body style: 2-seat tourer, 4-seat tourer, fabric saloon

Powertrain
- Engine: 1393 cc side valve I4
- Transmission: Four-speed manual

Dimensions
- Wheelbase: 102 in (2,591 mm)
- Length: 140 in (3,556 mm)

Chronology
- Predecessor: none
- Successor: Triumph 13/35

The Triumph 10/20 is a car manufactured from 1923 until 1926 by the Triumph Motor Company. It was the first Triumph automobile and was named the 10/20 for the Royal Automobile Club's taxation class of 10 horsepower rating and its actual output of 20 brake horsepower. The design was principally by Arthur Alderson assisted by Alan Lea and Arthur Sykes who were employed by Lea-Francis, to whom Triumph paid a royalty on every car made. It was powered by a 1,393 cc (1.4L) 4-cylinder side-valve engine designed by Harry Ricardo and fitted with a single updraught Zenith carburettor. The engine produced 23.5 brake horsepower (17.5 kW) at 3000 rpm, giving the car a top speed of 52 mph (84 km/h) and economy of 40 miles per imperial gallon (7.1 L/100 km; 33 mpg_{‑US}). The four-speed gearbox was mounted centrally and coupled to the engine by a short drive shaft.

The car was launched as a 2-seat, steel panelled, open tourer with provision for a third passenger in a dickey seat, utilising bodywork supplied by the Regent Carriage Company of London. A sports model with aluminium body panels and long wings soon followed, and then in 1924 a fabric-covered 4-seat Weymann saloon featuring a single door on the driver's side and two doors on the passenger side. It had a 102-inch (2,591 mm) wheelbase, making it the largest (by 20-inch (508 mm)) of the "light cars" of its era. It was the first British production car to be fitted with hydraulic brakes, but at first on the rear wheels only. Approximately 2,500 of this model and the parallel 13/35 and 15/50 models were made. The price was £430 to £460, expensive compared to a contemporary Wolseley 10 selling for £250.
