= Siegfried Bettmann =

German industrialist bicycle, motorcycle and car manufacturer (1863- 1951)

- Born: 18 April 1863; Nuremberg, Bavaria, Germany
- Died: 23 September 1951 (aged 88); Coventry, England
- Citizenship: Germany; United Kingdom
- Occupations: Cycle, motorcycle, and car manufacturer
- Spouse: Annie Meyrick

Siegfried Bettmann (18 April 1863 - 23 September 1951) was a bicycle, motorcycle and car manufacturer and founder of the Triumph Motorcycle Company. In 1914 he established the Annie Bettmann Foundation to help young people start businesses. Triumph became one of the most famous motorcycle trade-names in the world. Bettmann was also Mayor of Coventry from 1913 to 1914.

== Early life ==
Born in 1863 in Nuremberg, Germany, Siegfried Bettmann moved to England in 1885, and settled in Coventry, Warwickshire. He found work with Kelly & Co. compiling foreign directories for their publications. After six months, he obtained a job with the White Sewing Machine Co. as a translator and worked as the company's sales representative in northern Europe. Fluent in several languages, he perfected his English, and married a local woman, Annie Meyrick (known as Millie).

== Business ==
Bettmann founded S. Bettmann & Co and started selling bicycles by the name 'Triumph' from premises in London. In 1886, Bettmann sought a more general name, and the company became known as the Triumph Cycle Company. A year later, the company registered as the New Triumph Co. Ltd., with funding from the Dunlop Pneumatic Tyre Company. In that year, Bettmann was joined by a native from Papenburg named Johann Moritz Schulte, as a partner. Schulte encouraged Bettmann to transform Triumph into a manufacturing company, and in 1888 Bettmann purchased a site in Coventry using money lent by his and Schulte's families. The company began producing the first Triumph-branded bicycles in 1889. In 1896, Triumph initiated a subsidiary, Orial TWN (Triumph Werke Nuremberg) a German subsidiary for cycle production in his native city.

In 1902 the company diversified into making motorcycles at their works in Much Park Street. The first Triumph motorcycle in 1902 was a strengthened bicycle with a 2.25 bhp Minerva engine. Once the business grew, the purchased engines were replaced with their own and in 1907 the company expanded into a new factory in Priory Street, on the premises of a former mill.

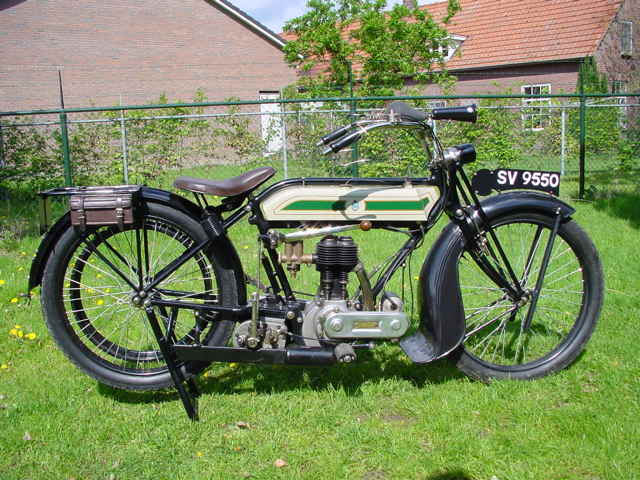
1922 Triumph H 1

At the beginning of World War I, the War Office called a meeting of Coventry industrialists at St Mary's Hall and asked them to put their resources at the disposal of the military. Two weeks after Britain had declared war on Germany, Bettmann received a telephone call from Capt. C. V. Holdsworth of the Army Service Corps (who later became Triumph's managing director) with an order for a hundred Triumph motorcycles for the BEF who were soon to go to France. Despite being a Saturday afternoon, Bettmann and his staff worked non-stop to create the required motorcycles and by Sunday evening they were delivered to the Coventry railway station in time for the evening train. The British Army subsequently placed large orders for the Triumph 550 cc Model H and by 1918 Triumph was Britain's largest motorcycle manufacturer.

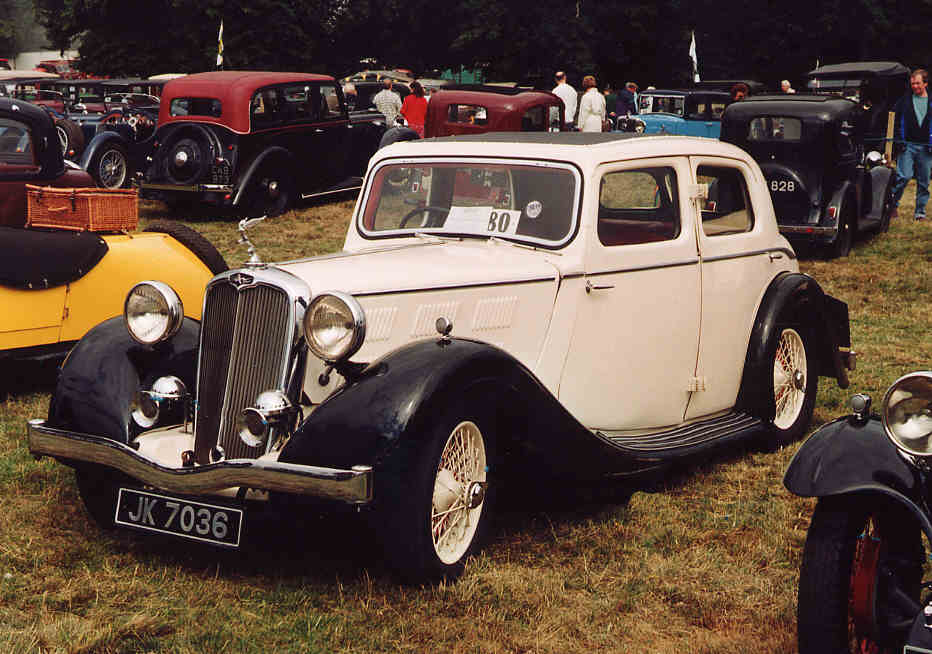
Triumph Gloria

In 1921 Bettmann further diversified into car production and bought the Dawson Car Company to produce the Triumph 10/20. In 1927 he developed the Triumph Super 7 which sold well until 1934. In 1930 the company changed its name to the Triumph Motor Company and produced the Triumph Southern Cross and Gloria ranges. In 1936 the company had financial problems, and in 1936 the Triumph bicycle and motorcycle businesses were both sold. The motorcycle business was bought by Jack Sangster of Ariel Motorcycles to become Triumph Engineering Co Ltd.

== Later life ==
Siegfried Bettmann's success enabled him to become President of the Coventry Liberal Association. A Freemason and founder member of Coventry's Chamber of Commerce, he was also a Justice of the Peace and in 1913 became Mayor of Coventry, the first non-British subject to have the position.

Bettmann was a naturalised British citizen, but his German origins resulted in him being removed as Mayor of Coventry on the beginning of the First World War.

In 1914 Siegfried Bettmann founded the Annie Bettmann Foundation with his wife to help young Coventry people between the ages of eighteen and forty who wished to start a business. Preference was given to ex-servicemen and the fund, which is still in existence, was extended subsequently to include grants for further education. Bettmann also commissioned a memorial for the 66 employees of the Triumph company killed in action during the First World War, built in Coventry's London Road cemetery in 1921.

The Triumph Motorcycle Company became one of the most famous motorcycle marques of the world and Bettmann retained an association with the company until his death. Bettmann died on 23 September 1951. In 2015 the Coventry Society installed a Blue Plaque onto this residence. In 2025 the Coventry Branch of the Historical Association UK made their pamphlet on Siegfried Bettmann's life available online and open access.

== See also ==
- Triumph Engineering
- Triumph Motor Company
- Standard Motor Company
- Triumph (TWN)
- Triumph Cycle Co. Ltd
