= Triumph Motorcycles =

Triumph Motorcycles refers to companies that were founded by German S. Bettmann in the late 1800s, with varying ownership:

- Triumph (TWN) (Triumph-Werke Nürnberg), a defunct German motorcycle manufacturer (1896–1956)
- Triumph Engineering Co Ltd, a defunct British motorcycle manufacturer (1885–1951 taken over by BSA, 1972 merged with Norton)
- Norton Villiers Triumph, a defunct British motorcycle manufacturer (1972–1978/1983)
- Triumph Motorcycles Ltd, a current British motorcycle manufacturer (since 1983)
