= Triumph Motor Company =

British car manufacturing company, 1885–1984

- Founded: 1885; 141 years ago (as S. Bettmann & Co. Import Export Agency)
- Defunct: 1984
- Fate: Acquired by Leyland Motors (1960) marque retired (1984) marque acquired by BMW (1994)
- Headquarters: Coventry, England, UK
- Key people: Siegfried Bettmann, Moritz Schulte (founders)
- Parent: Standard Motors Ltd, Leyland Motors Ltd., British Leyland Motor Corporation Ltd, BL plc

The Triumph Motor Company was a British car and motor manufacturing company in the 19th and 20th centuries. The marque had its origins in 1885 when Siegfried Bettmann of Nuremberg formed S. Bettmann & Co. and started importing bicycles from Europe and selling them under his own trade name in London. The trade name became "Triumph" the following year, and in 1887, Bettmann was joined by a partner, Moritz Schulte, also from Germany. In 1889, the businessmen started producing their own bicycles in Coventry, England.

Triumph manufactured its first car in 1923. The company was acquired by Leyland Motors in 1960, ultimately becoming part of the giant conglomerate British Leyland (BL) in 1968, where the Triumph brand was absorbed into BL's Specialist Division alongside former Leyland stablemates Rover and Jaguar. Triumph-badged vehicles were produced by BL until 1984, when the Triumph marque was retired, and it remained dormant under the auspices of BL's successor, Rover Group. The rights to the Triumph marque are currently owned by BMW, which purchased the Rover Group in 1994.

== History ==
=== Triumph Cycle Company (1897–1930) ===
S. Bettman & Co. was renamed the Triumph Cycle Co. Ltd. in 1897. In 1902 they began producing Triumph motorcycles at their works in Coventry on Much Park Street. At first, they used engines purchased from another company, but the business prospered and they soon started making their own engines. In 1907 they purchased the premises of a spinning mill on Priory Street to develop a new factory. Major orders for the 550 cc Model H were placed by the British Army during the First World War; by 1918 Triumph had become Britain's largest manufacturer of motorcycles.

In 1921, Bettmann was persuaded by his general manager Claude Holbrook (1886–1979), who had joined the company in 1919, to acquire the assets and Clay Lane premises of the Dawson Car Company and start producing a car and 1.4-litre engine type named the Triumph 10/20 designed for them by Lea-Francis, to whom they paid a royalty for every car sold. Production of this car and its immediate successors was moderate, but this changed with the introduction in 1927 of the Triumph Super 7, which sold in large numbers until 1934.

=== Triumph Motor Company (1930–1944) ===
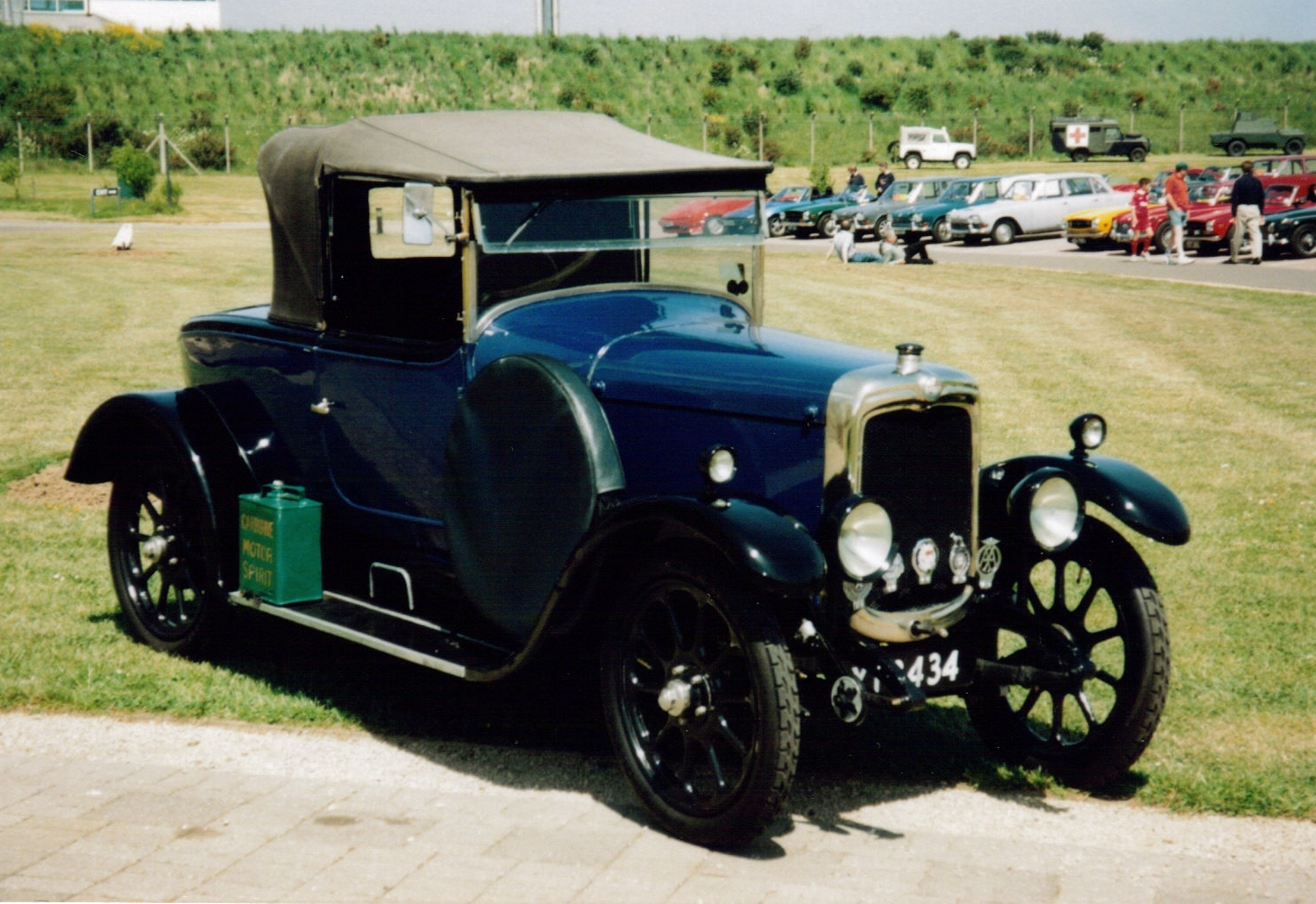
1923 Triumph 10/20

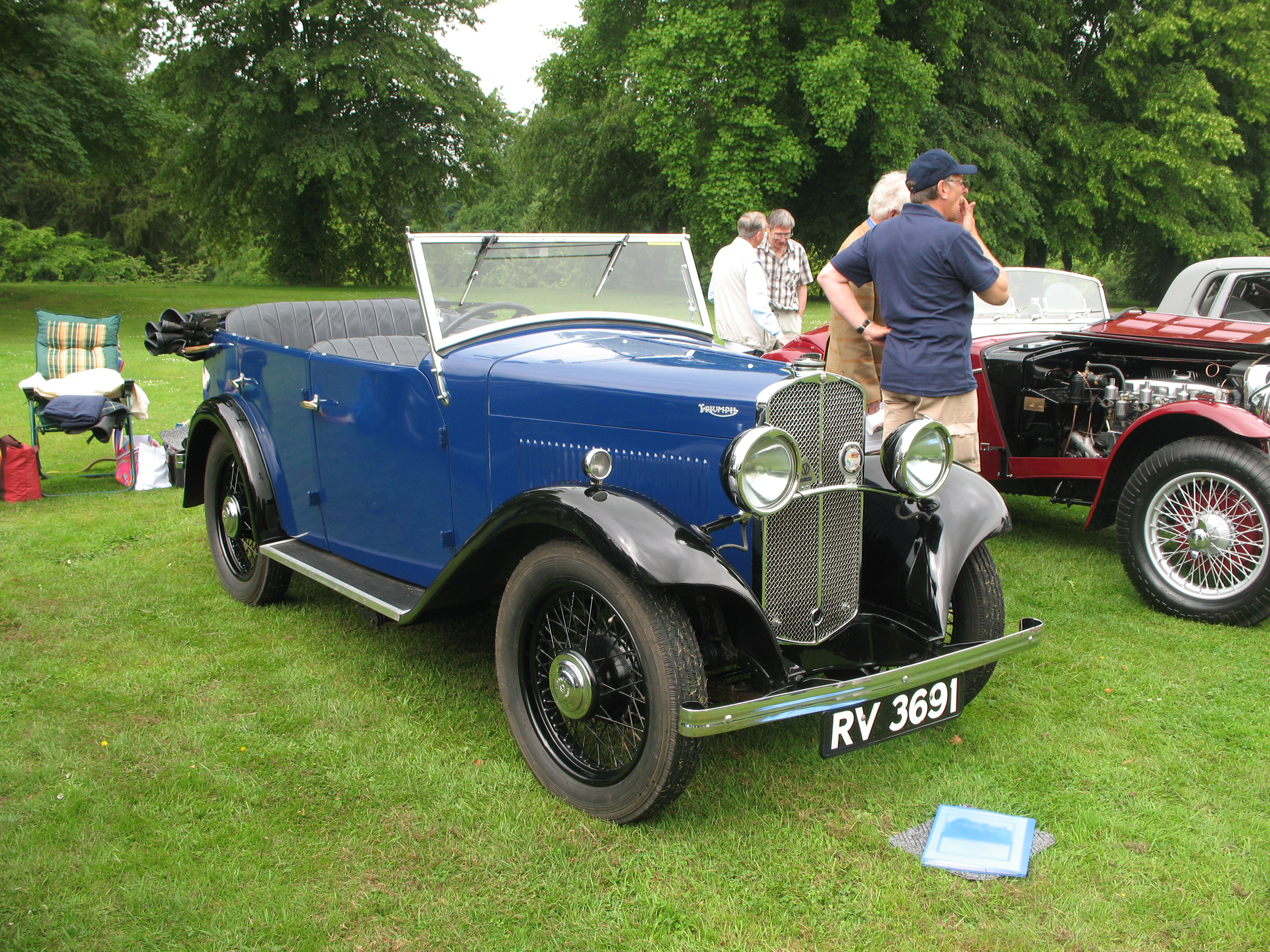
1931 Triumph Super 9, 4 Door Tourer

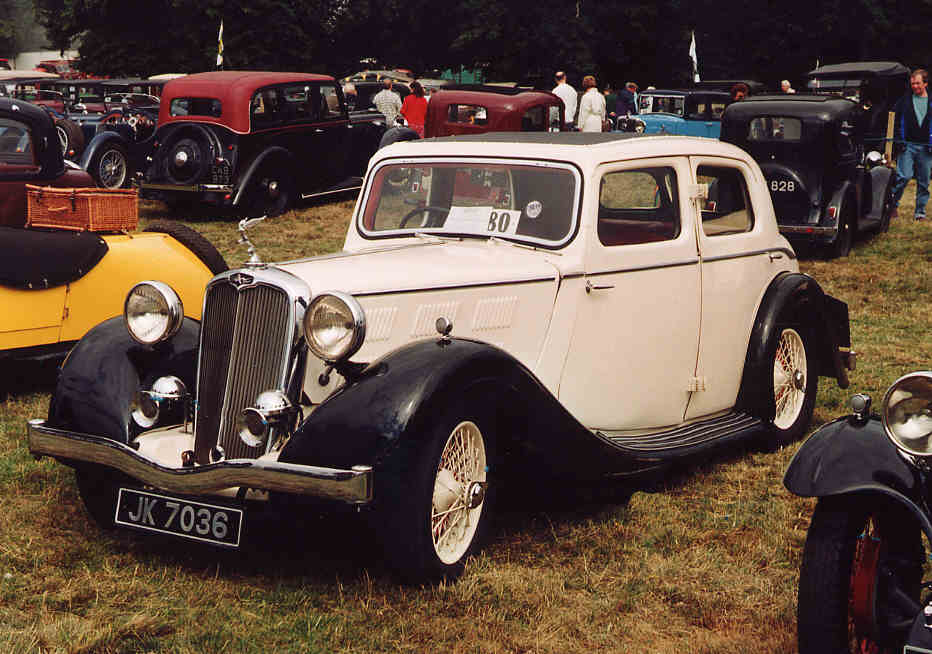
1934 Triumph Gloria Six

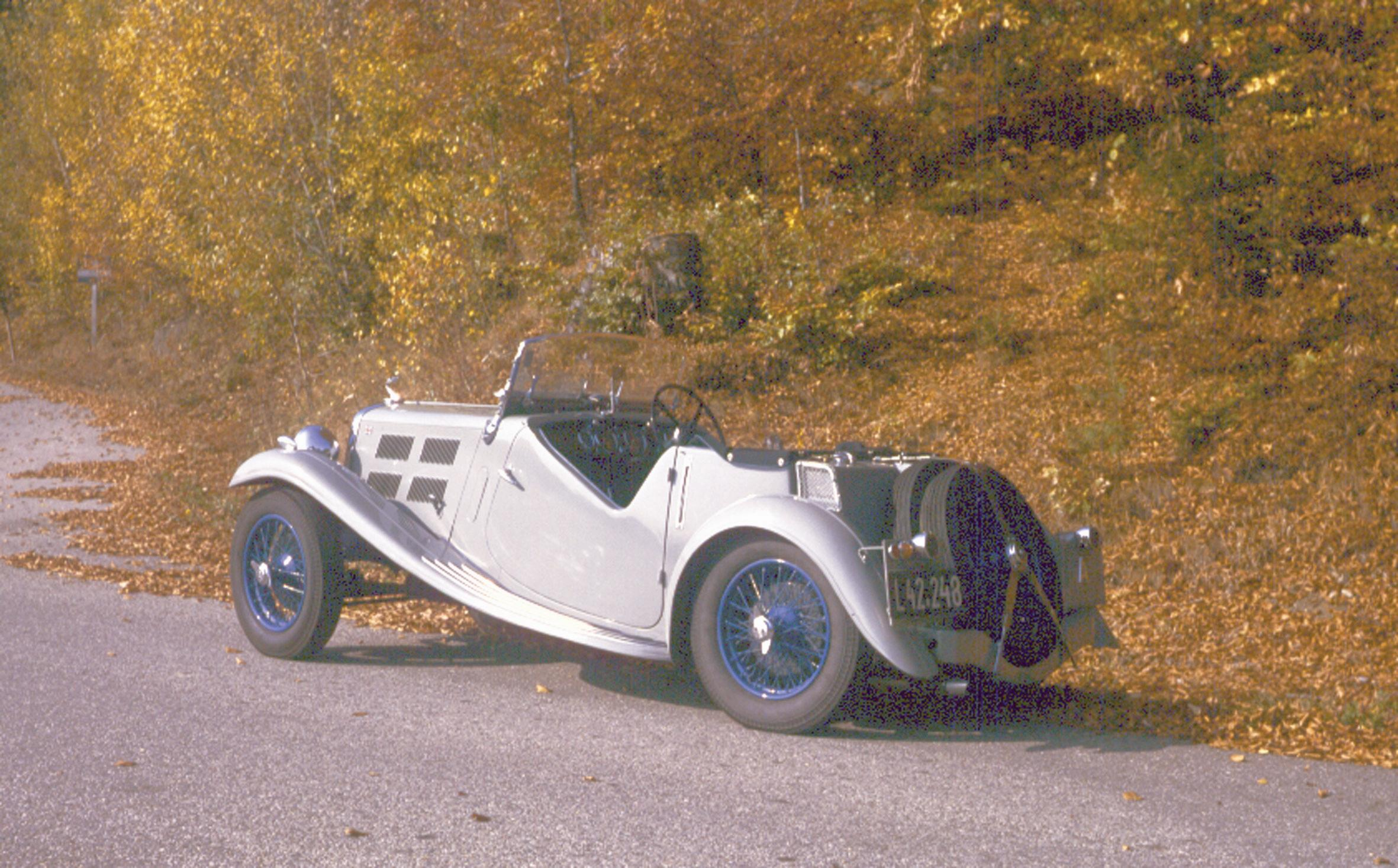
1936 Triumph Gloria Southern Cross 10.8 HP (four, 1,232 cc)

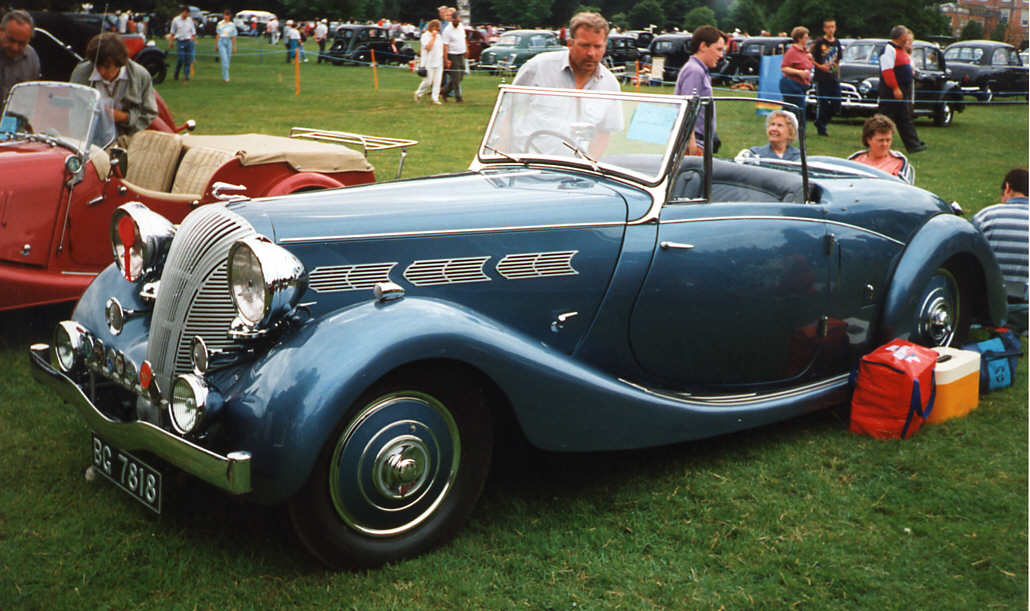
1937 Triumph Dolomite Roadster

In 1930, the company's name was changed to Triumph Motor Company. Holbrook realised he could not compete with the larger car companies for the mass market, so he decided to produce expensive cars, and introduced the models Southern Cross and Gloria. At first they used engines made by Triumph but designed by Coventry Climax, but in 1937 Triumph started to produce engines to their own designs by Donald Healey, who had become the company's experimental manager in 1934.

The company encountered financial problems however, and in 1936 the Triumph bicycle and motorcycle businesses were sold, the latter to Jack Sangster of Ariel to become Triumph Engineering Co Ltd. Healey purchased an Alfa Romeo 8C 2300 and developed a new car model with an Alfa inspired straight-8 engine type named the Triumph Dolomite. Three of these cars were made in 1934, one of which was used in competition and destroyed in an accident. The Dolomites manufactured from 1937 to 1940 were unrelated to these prototypes.

In July 1939, the Triumph Motor Company went into receivership and the factory, equipment and goodwill were offered for sale. The Thos. W. Ward scrapping company purchased Triumph, and placed Healey in charge as general manager, but the effects of the Second World War again stopped the production of cars; the Holbrook Lane works were completely destroyed by bombing in 1940.

=== Standard Triumph (1944–1960) ===
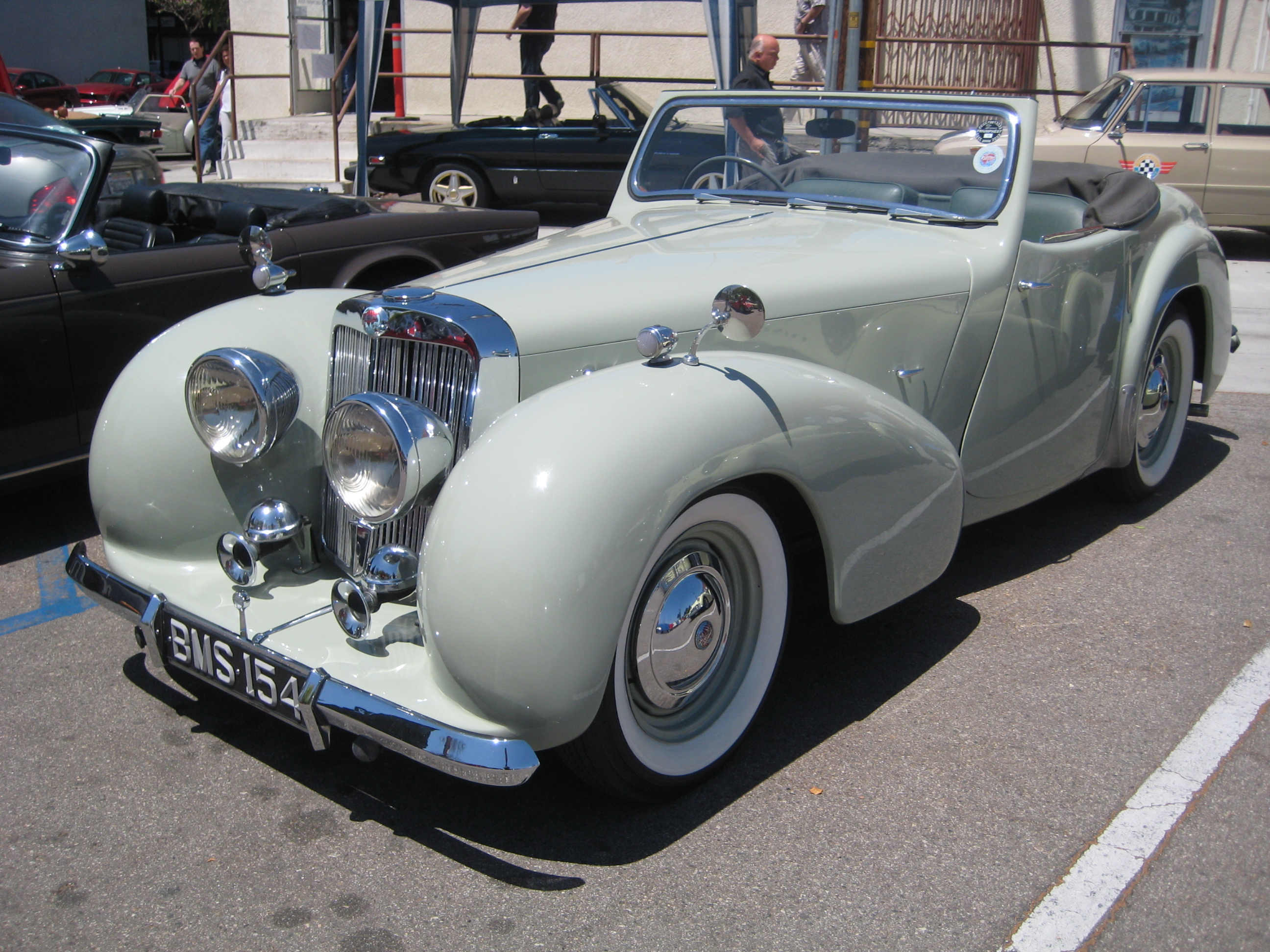
1946 Triumph 1800 Roadster

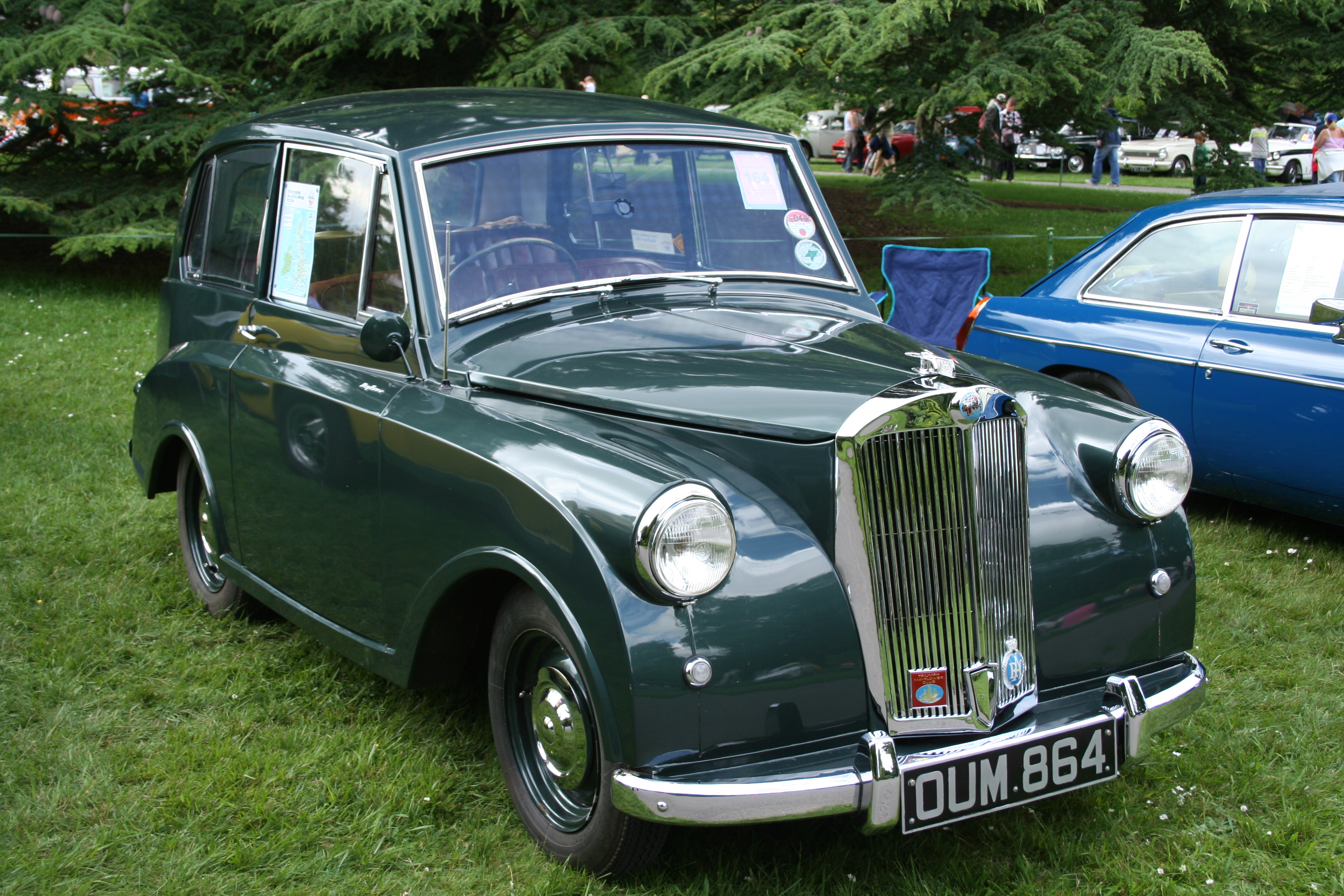
1950 Triumph Mayflower

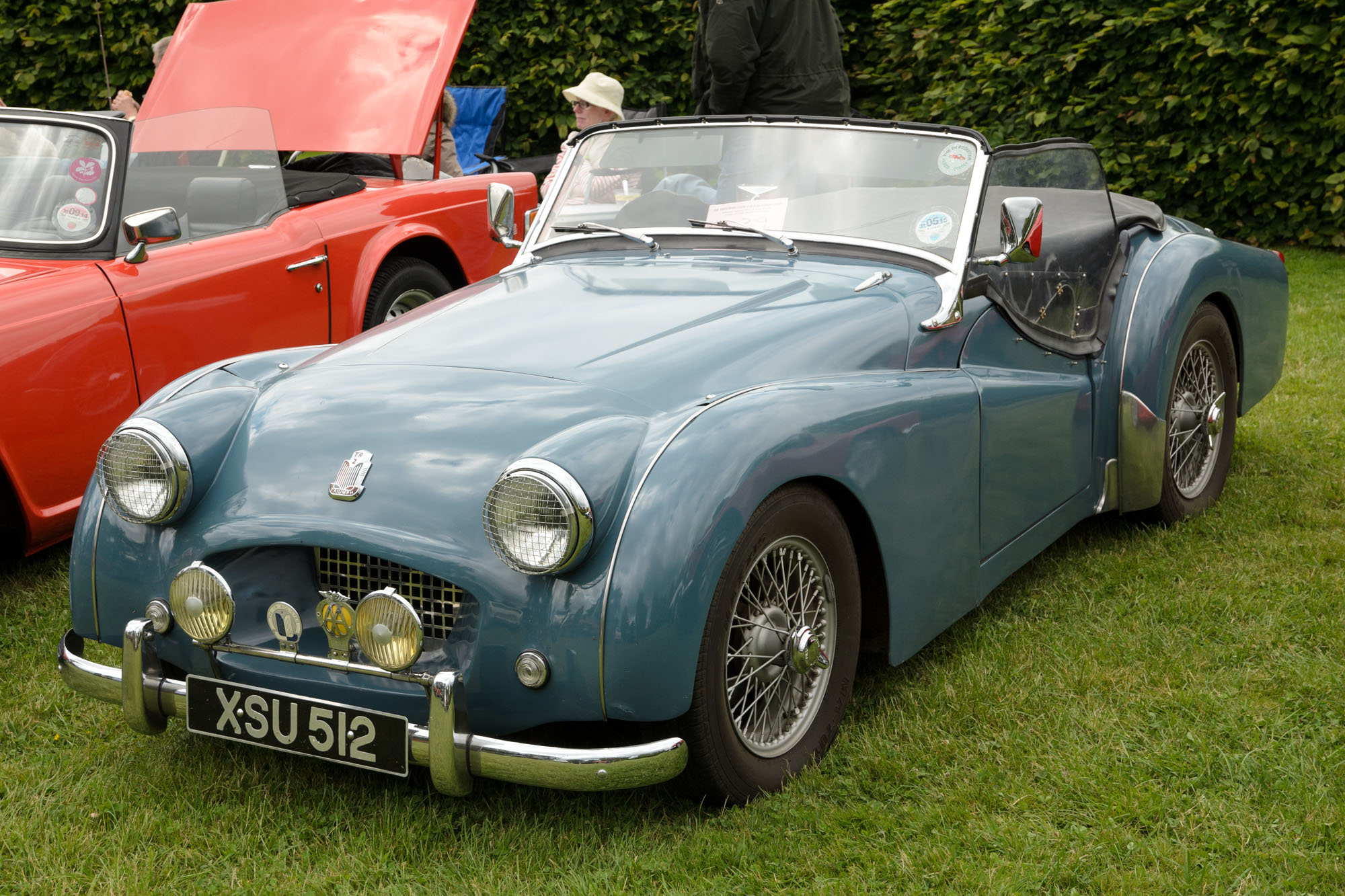
1954 Triumph TR2

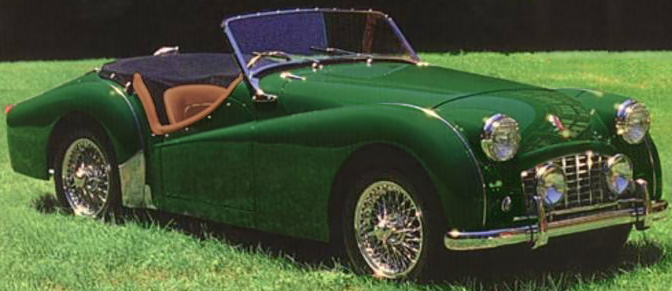
1955–57 Triumph TR3

In November 1944, what was left of the Triumph Motor Company and the Triumph trade name were bought by the Standard Motor Company and a subsidiary "Triumph Motor Company (1945) Limited" was formed with production transferred to Standard's factory at Canley, on the outskirts of Coventry. Triumph's new owners had been supplying engines to Jaguar and its predecessor company since 1938. After an argument between Standard-Triumph managing director, Sir John Black, and William Lyons, the creator and owner of Jaguar, Black's objective in acquiring the rights to the name and the remnants of the bankrupt Triumph business was to build a car to compete with the soon to be launched post-war Jaguars.

The pre-war Triumph models were not revived and in 1946 a new range of Triumphs was announced, starting with the Triumph Roadster. The Roadster had an aluminium body because steel was in short supply and surplus aluminium from aircraft production was plentiful. The same engine was used for the 1800 Town and Country saloon, later named the Triumph Renown, which was notable for the styling chosen by Standard-Triumph's managing director Sir John Black. A similar style was also used for the subsequent Triumph Mayflower light saloon. All three of these models prominently sported the "globe" badge that had been used on pre-war models. When Sir John was forced to retire from the company this range of cars was discontinued without being replaced directly, sheet aluminium having by now become a prohibitively expensive alternative to sheet steel for most auto-industry purposes.

In the early 1950s, it was decided to use the Triumph name for sporting cars and the Standard name for saloons and in 1953 the Triumph TR2 was initiated, the first of the TR series of sports cars that were produced until 1981. Curiously, the TR2 had a Standard badge on its front and the Triumph globe on its hubcaps.

Standard had been making a range of small saloons named the Standard Eight and Ten, and had been working on their replacements. The success of the TR range meant that Triumph was considered a more marketable name than Standard, and the new car was introduced in 1959 as the Triumph Herald. The last Standard car to be made in the UK was replaced in 1963 by the Triumph 2000.

=== Leyland and beyond (1960–1984) ===
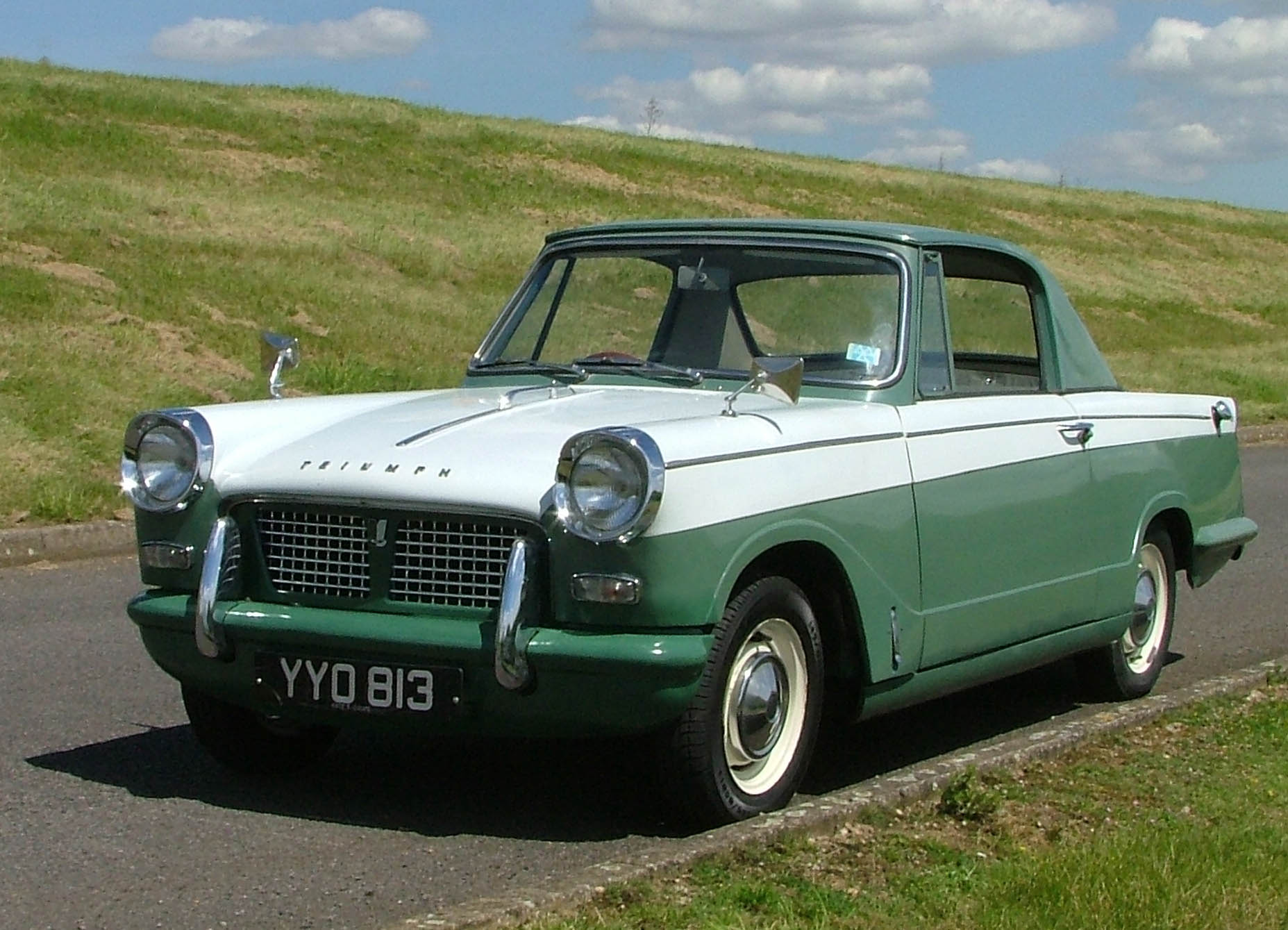
1960 Triumph Herald 948cc Coupe

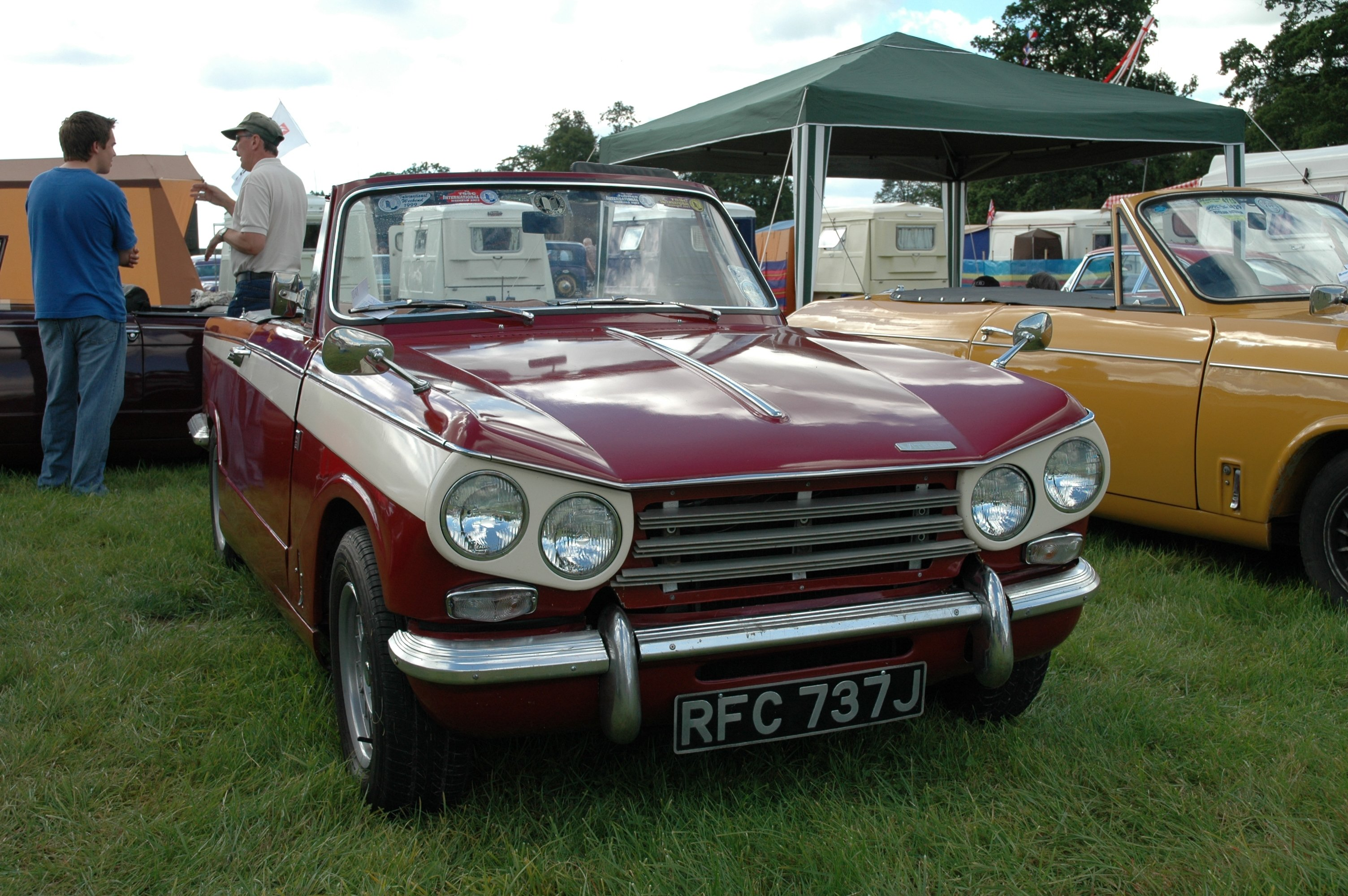
1970 Triumph Vitesse Mk.2 Convertible

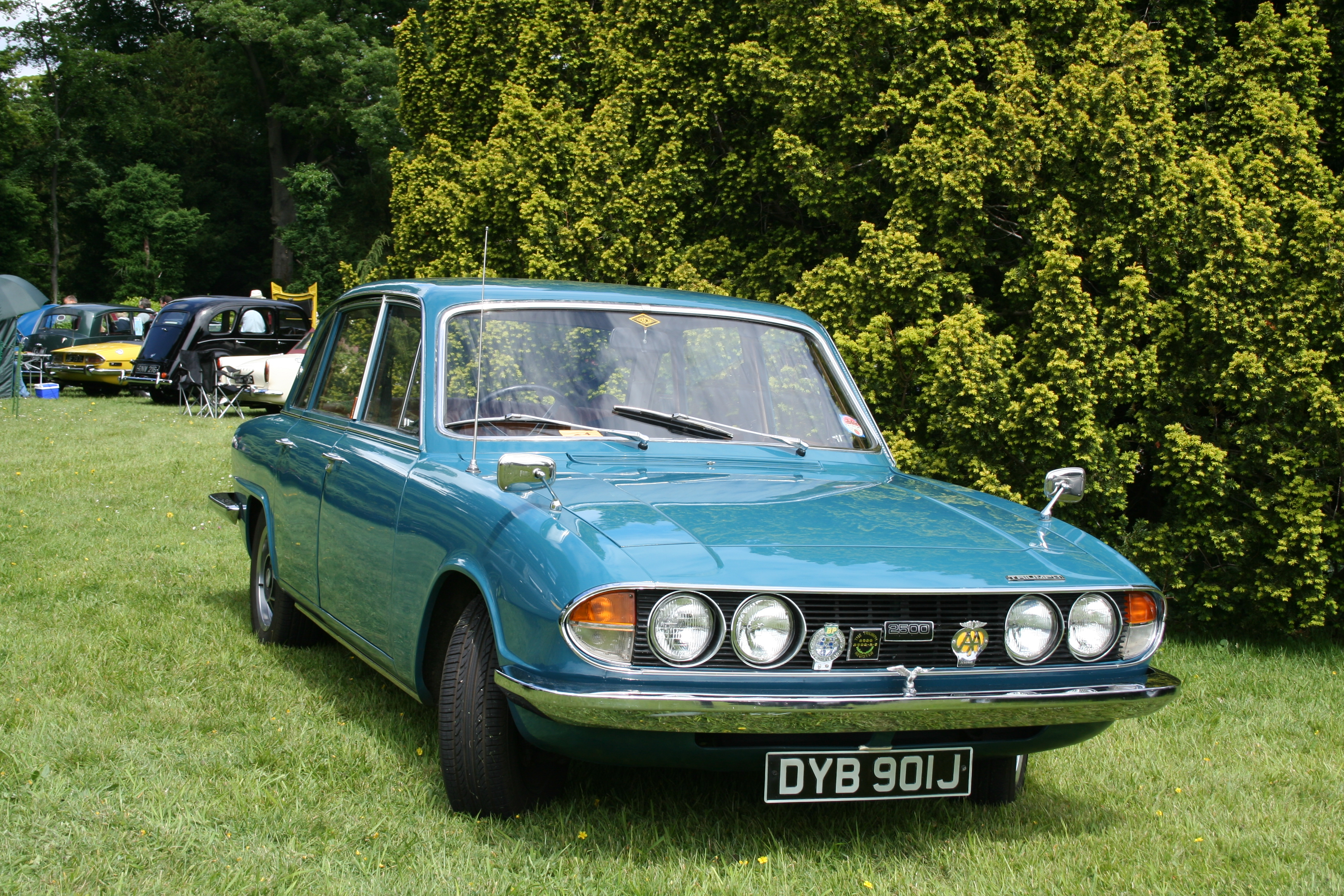
1971 Triumph 2.5PI

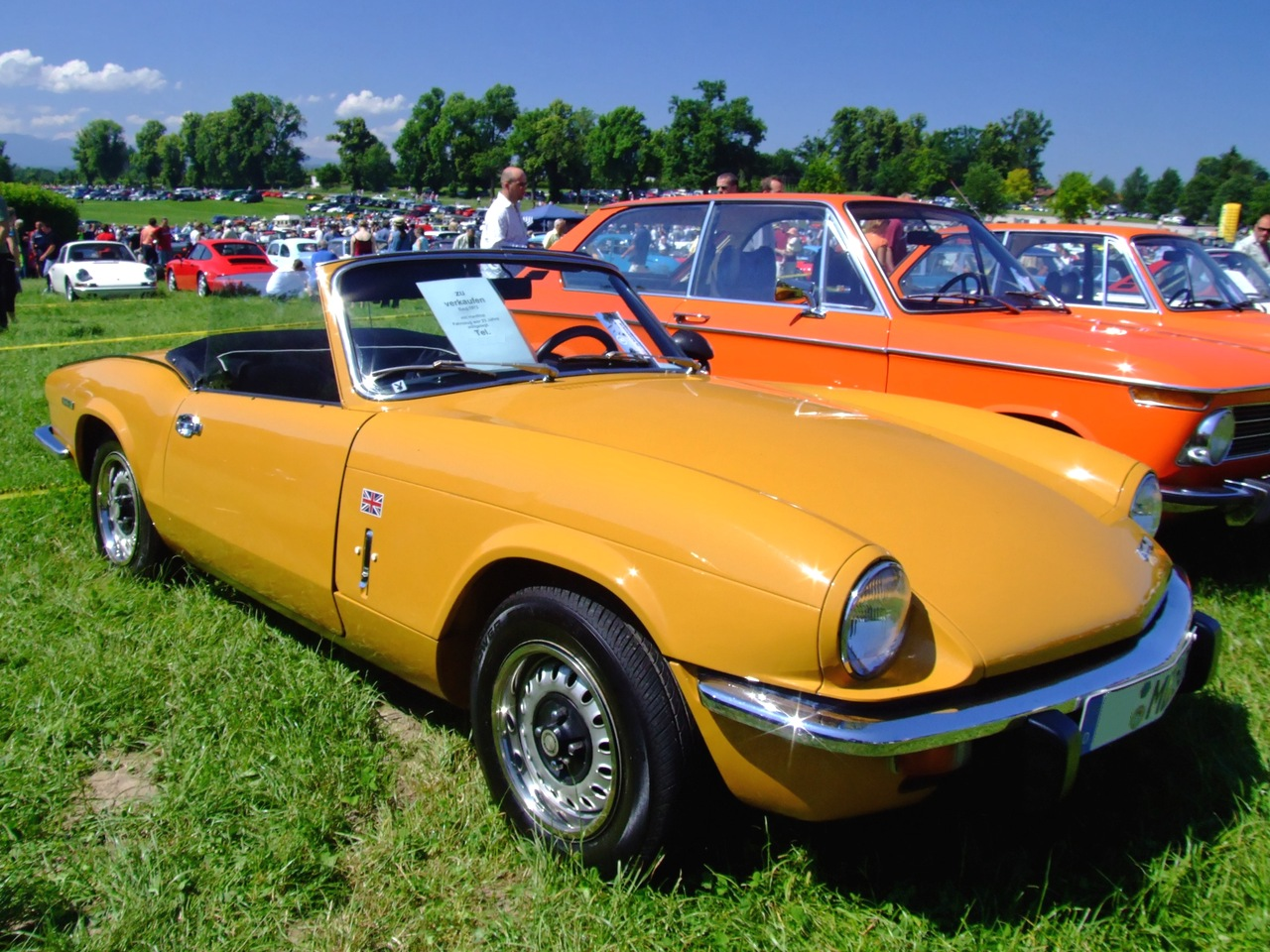
1973 Triumph Spitfire

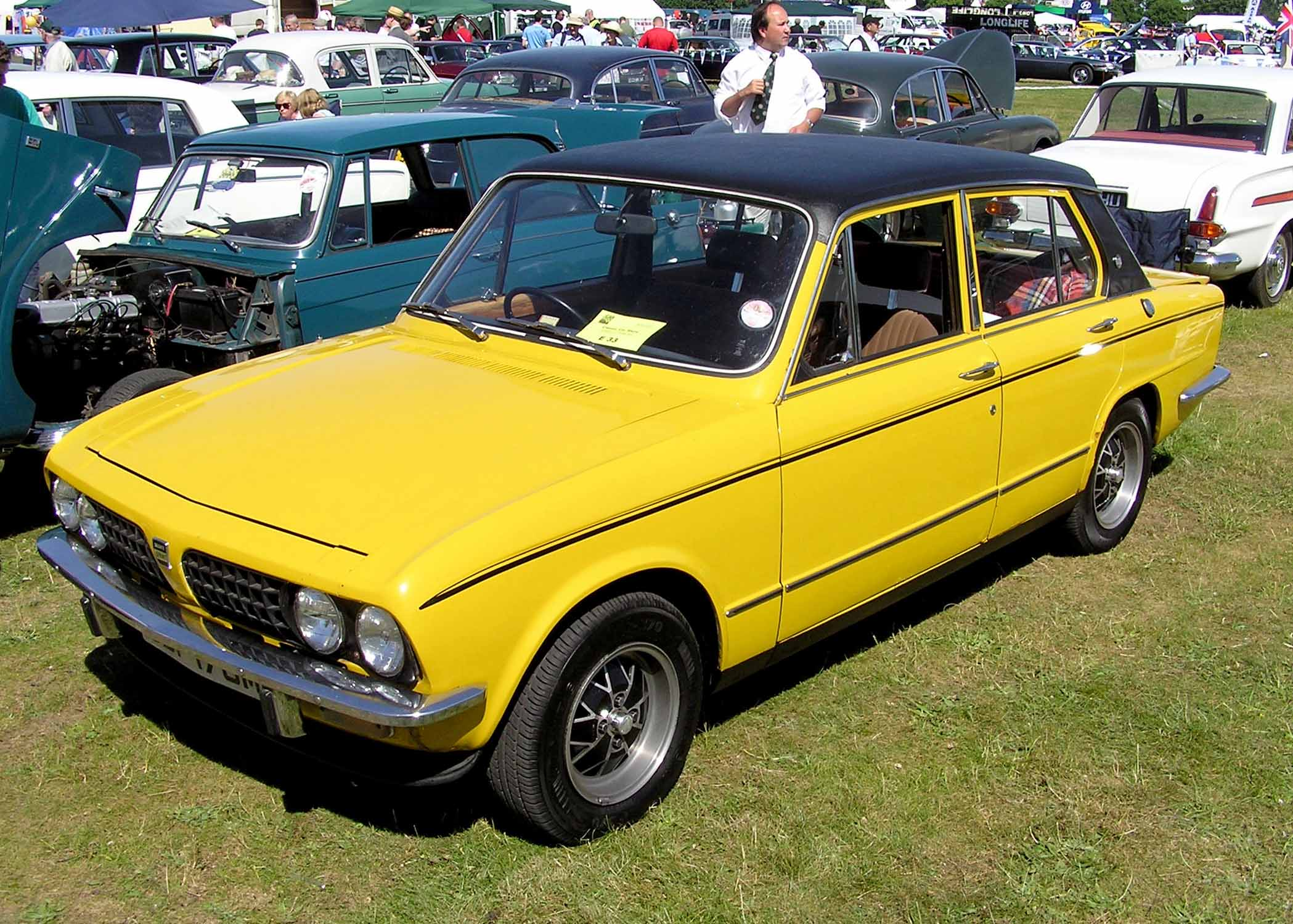
1973 Triumph Dolomite Sprint

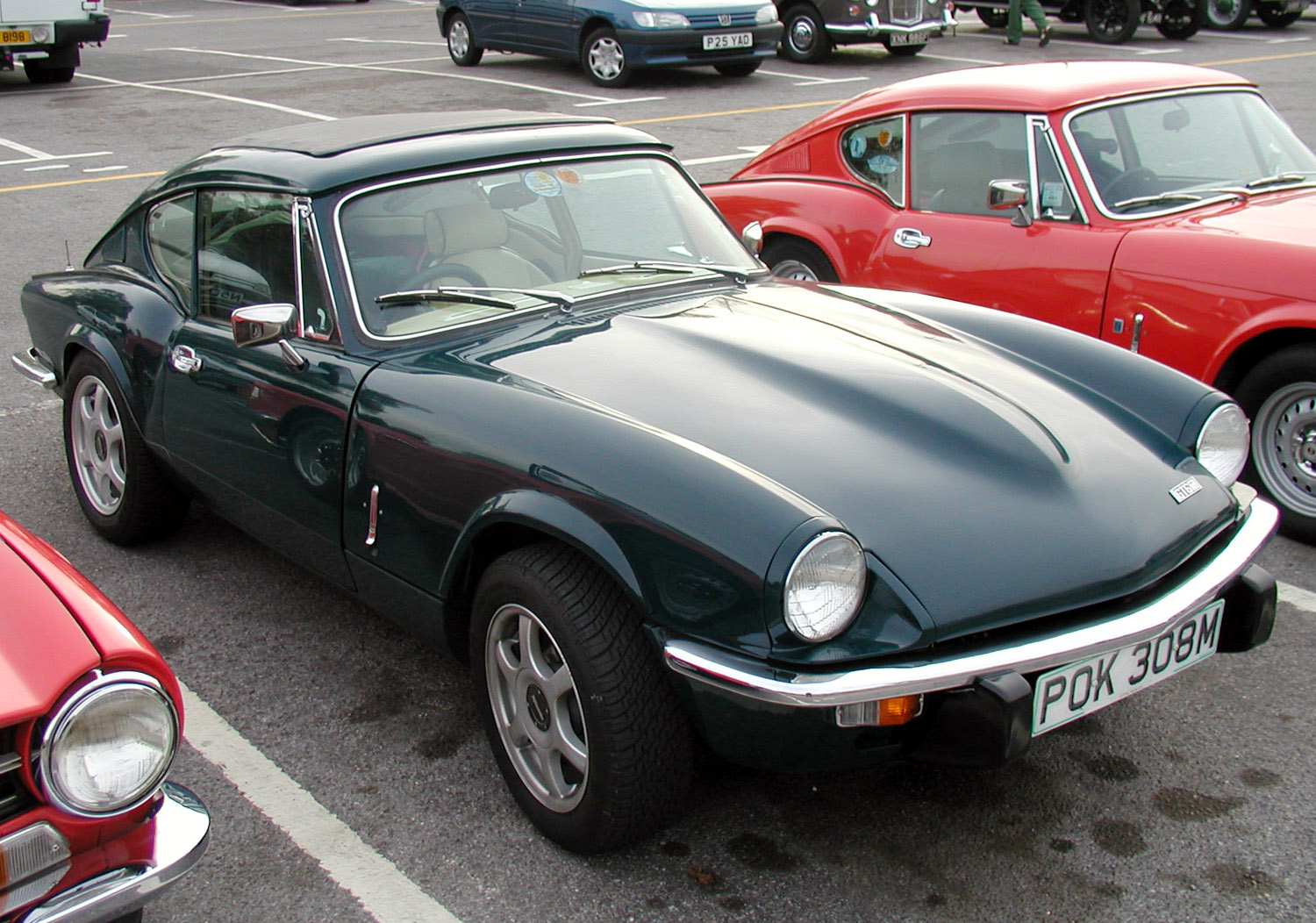
1974 Triumph GT6 Coupé

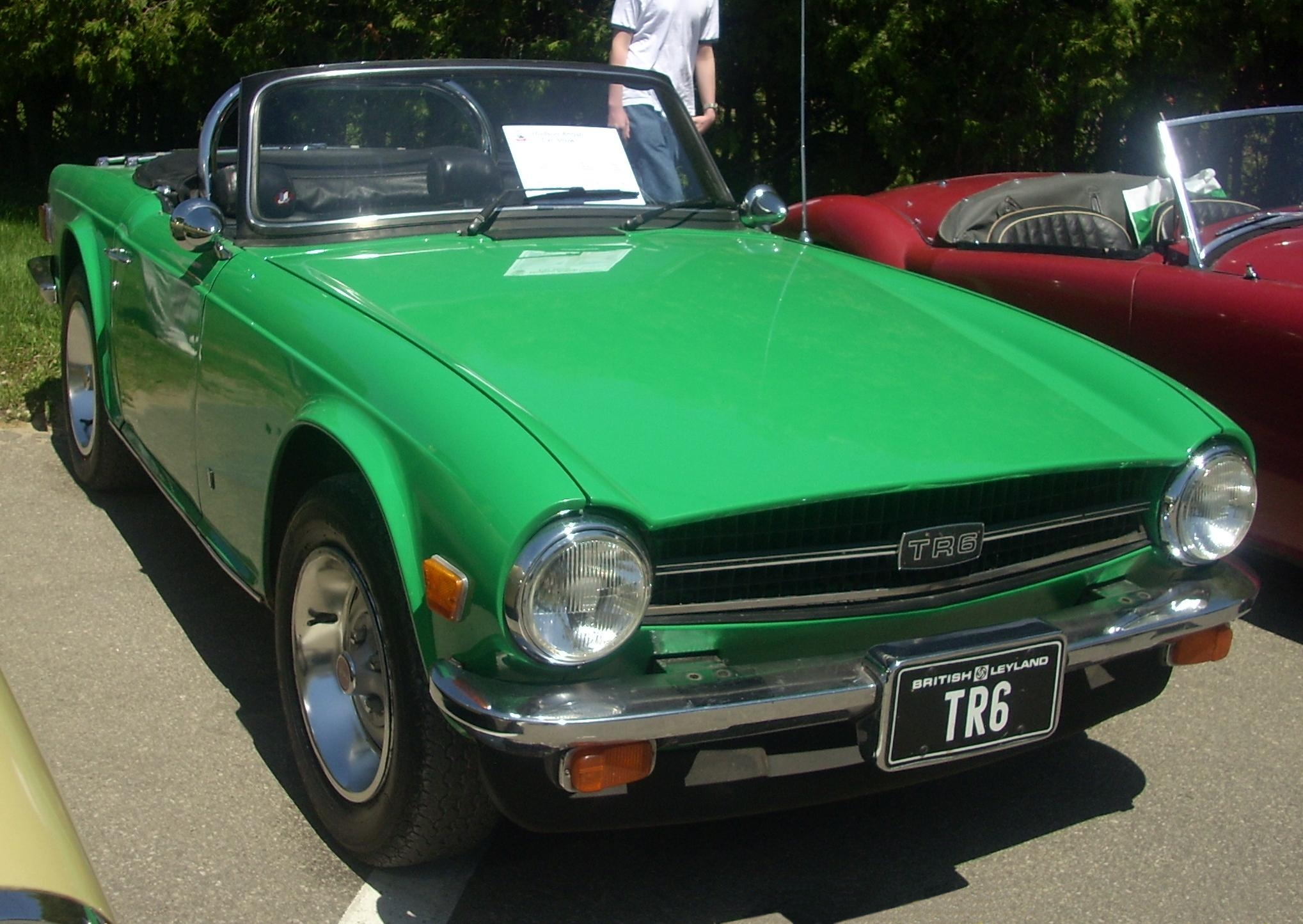
1976 Triumph TR6

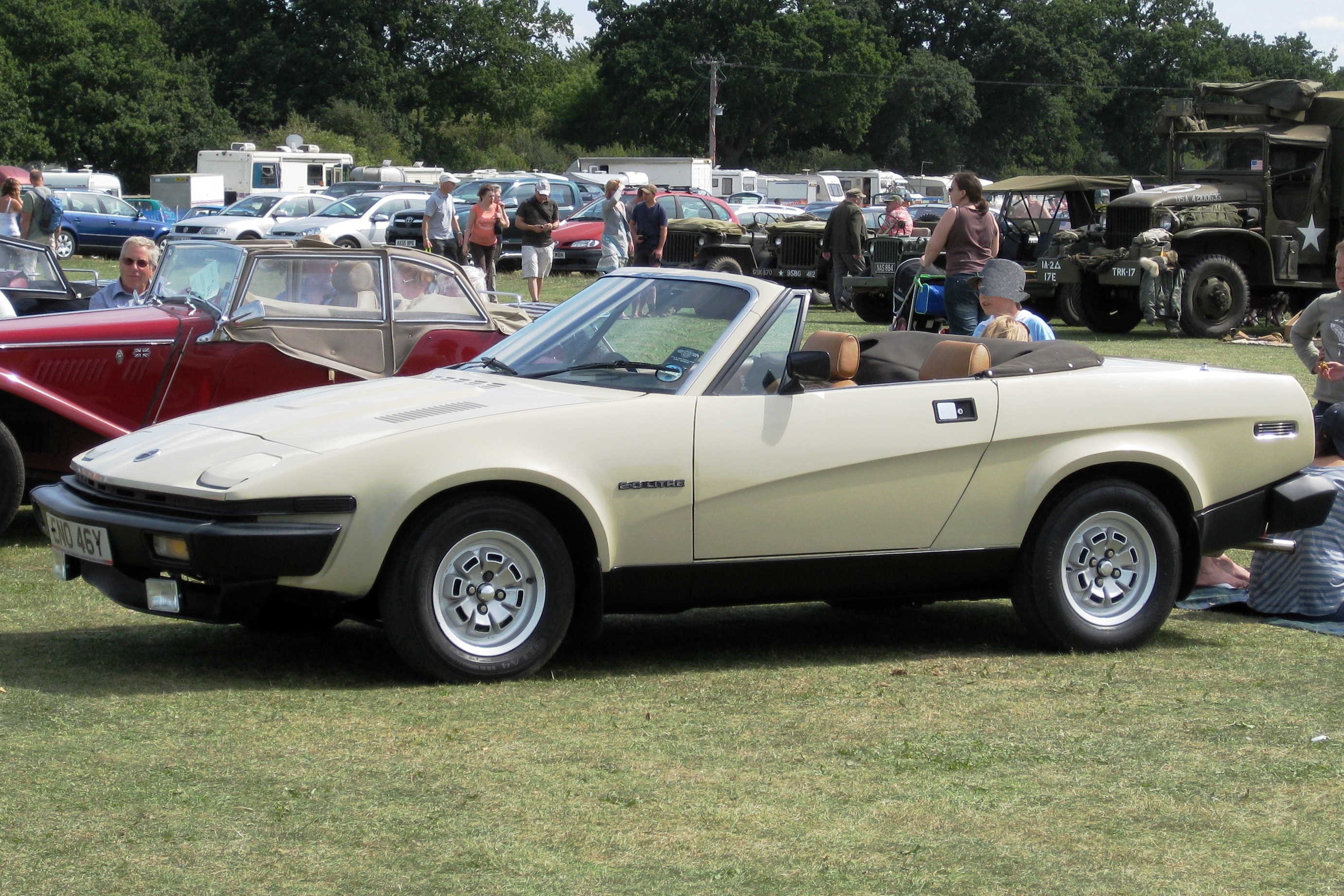
1982 Triumph TR7 cabriolet

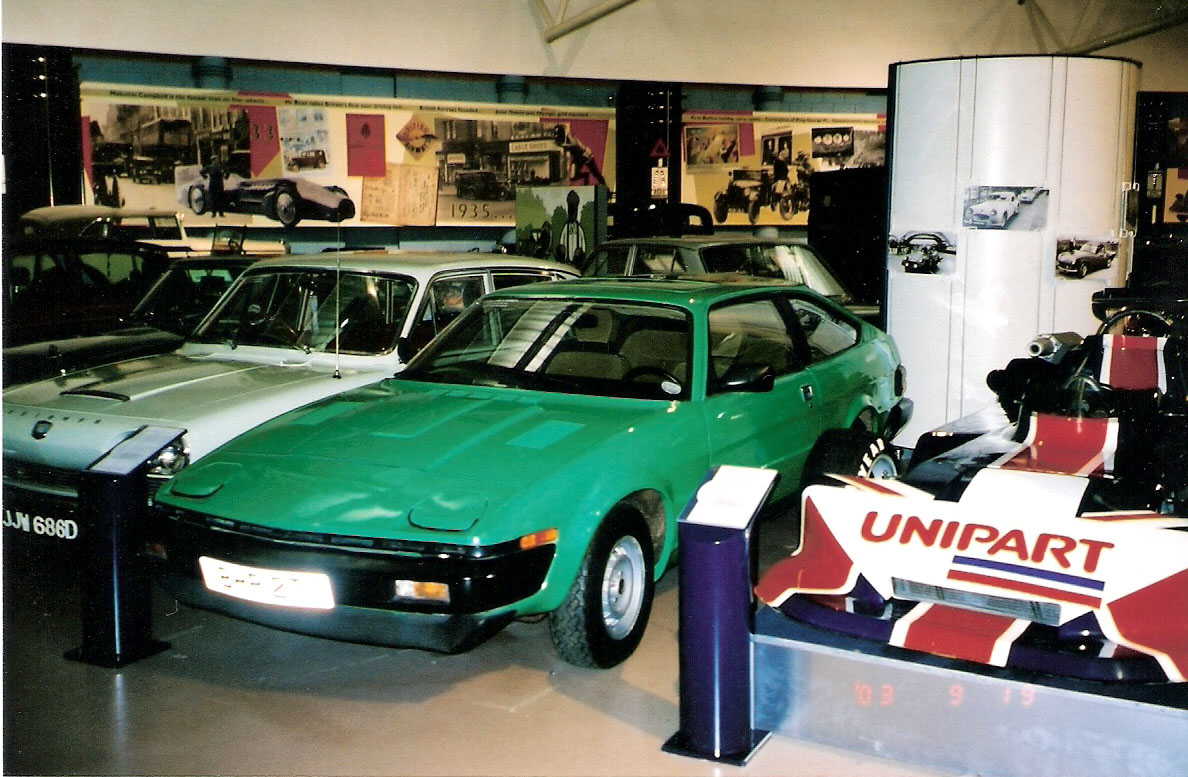
1978 Triumph Lynx

Standard-Triumph was bought by Leyland Motors Ltd. in December 1960; Donald Stokes became chairman of the Standard-Triumph division in 1963. In 1967 Leyland Motor Corporation bought the Rover company and in 1968 Leyland Motor Corporation merged with British Motor Holdings (created out of the merger of the British Motor Corporation and Jaguar two years earlier) which resulted in the formation of British Leyland Motor Corporation. Triumph set up an assembly facility in Speke, Liverpool in 1960, gradually increasing the size of the company's most modern factory to the point that it could produce 100,000 cars per year. However, only a maximum of 30,000 cars was ever produced as the plant was never put into full production use, being used largely as an assembly plant. During the 1960s and '70s Triumph sold a succession of Michelotti-styled saloons and sports cars, including the advanced Dolomite Sprint, which, in 1973, already had a 16-valve four-cylinder engine. It is alleged that many Triumphs of this era were unreliable, especially the 2.5 PI (petrol injection) with its fuel injection problems. In Australia, the summer heat caused petrol in the electric fuel pump to vapourise, resulting in frequent malfunctions. Although the injection system had proven itself in international competition, it lacked altitude compensation to adjust the fuel mixture at altitudes greater than 3,000 feet (910 m) above sea level. The Lucas system proved unpopular: Lucas did not want to develop it further, and Standard-Triumph dealers were reluctant to attend the associated factory and field-based training courses.

For most of its time under Leyland or BL ownership the Triumph marque belonged in the Specialist Division of the company, which went by the names of Rover Triumph and later Jaguar Rover Triumph, except for a brief period during the mid-1970s when all BL's car marques or brands were grouped together under the name of Leyland Cars. The only all-new Triumph model initiated as Rover Triumph was the TR7, which was in production successively at three factories that were closed: Speke, the poorly run Leyland-era Standard-Triumph works in Liverpool, the original Standard works at Canley, Coventry and finally the Rover works in Solihull. Plans for an extended range based on the TR7, including a fastback variant codenamed "Lynx", were ended when the Speke factory closed. The four-cylinder TR7 and its short-lived eight-cylindered derivative the TR8 were terminated when the road car section of the Solihull plant was closed (the plant continued to build Land Rovers.)

=== Demise of Triumph Cars ===
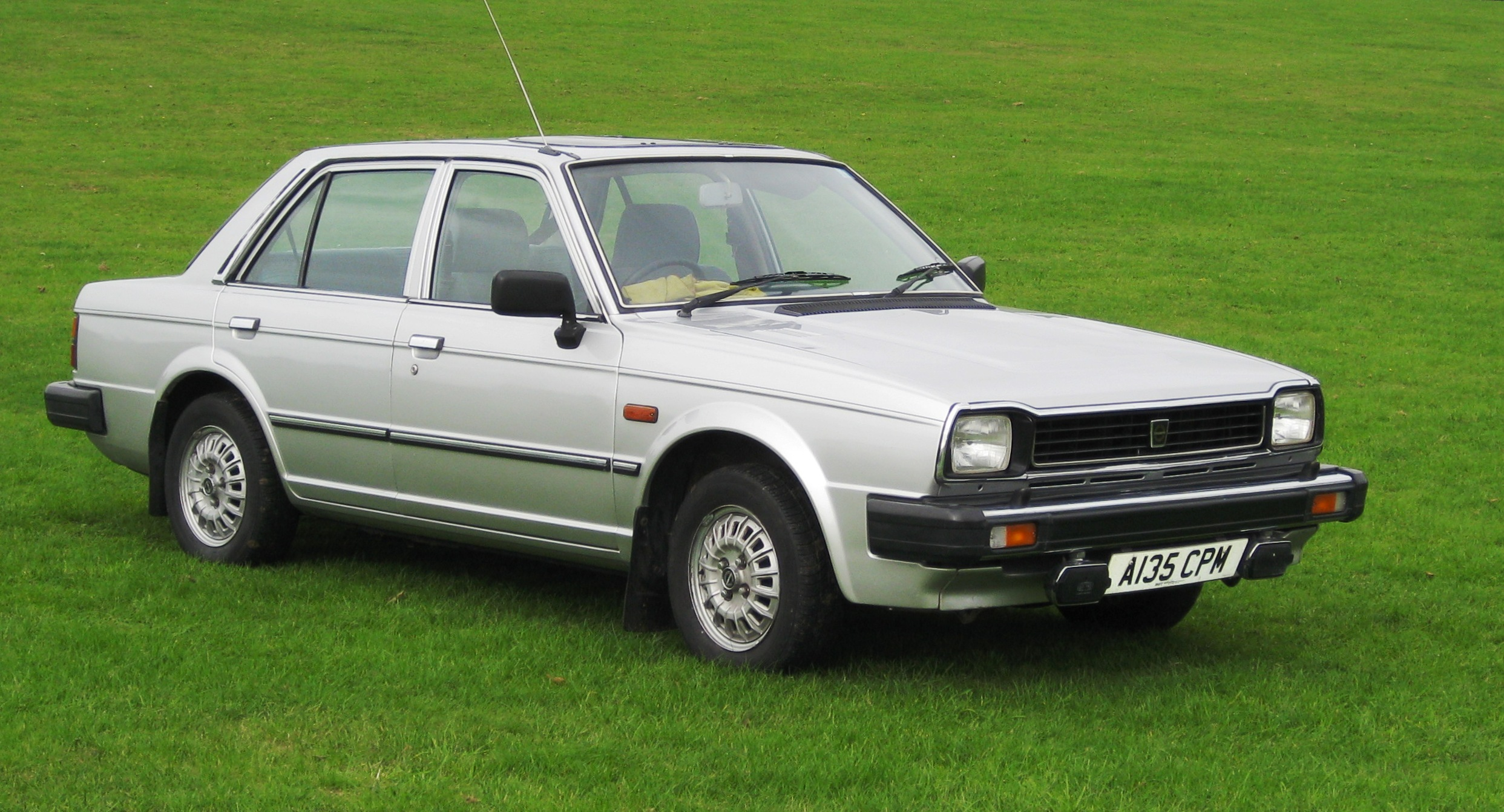
1983 Triumph Acclaim

The last Triumph model was the Acclaim, introduced in 1981 and essentially a rebadged Honda Ballade built under licence from the Japanese carmaker Honda, at the former Morris Motors works in Cowley, Oxford. The Triumph name disappeared over the summer of 1984, when the Acclaim was replaced by the Rover 200, a rebadged version of Honda's next generation Civic/Ballade model. This was the first phase of a rebranding of the Rover Group which would also see the Austin and Morris brands disappear by the end of the 1980s and the Rover brand dominate most of the company's products. The BL car division had by then been named the Austin Rover Group, which also retired the Morris marque in 1984 as well as the Triumph brand.

=== Current ownership and possible revival ===
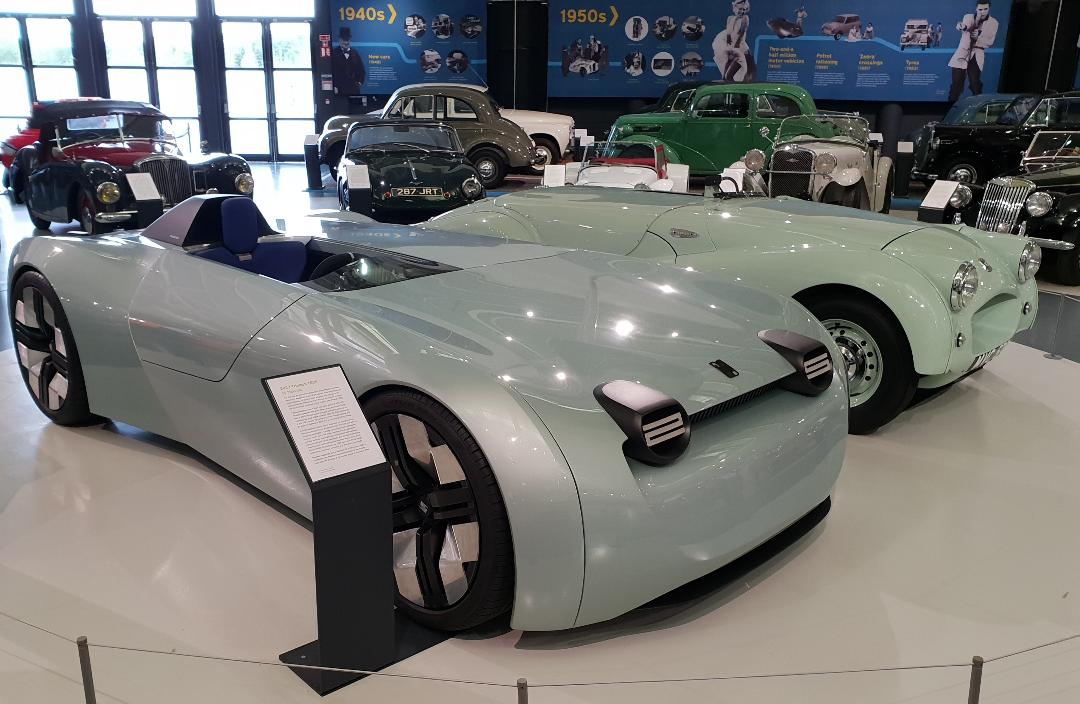
2023 Makkina Triumph TR25 Concept

The trademark is owned currently by BMW, which acquired Triumph when it bought the Rover Group in 1994. When BMW sold Rover, it retained the Triumph and Riley marques. The Phoenix Consortium, which bought Rover, attempted to buy the Triumph brand, but BMW refused, saying that if Phoenix insisted, it would break the deal. The Standard marque was transferred to British Motor Heritage Limited. The Standard marque is still retained by British Motor Heritage, who also have the licence to use the Triumph marque in relation to the sale of spares and service of the existing 'park' of Triumph cars.

Proposals were reportedly made in the early 2000s for BMW to market a cheaper, four cylinder, rear wheel drive car based on the Z4 Roadster to rival the Mazda MX-5. This new car was speculated to be branded as either an Austin-Healey or a Triumph. Development of the car took place, although production did not commence.

In 2005, it was reported that BMW's Designworks studio in California proposed reviving the Triumph brand for use on the new Mini Roadster, branding and styling it as a Triumph. The idea was rejected by Mini dealers, averse to selling a second legacy brand and adding extra showrooms.

In 2011, BMW applied for a European trademark to use the Triumph laurel wreath badge on vehicles, as well as a wide variety of merchandise. The application was published in late 2012, and further stirred rumours regarding the revival of the Triumph brand. Piers Scott, head of corporate communications for BMW Australia stated in an interview with Drive that:

"[The Triumph brand] is always there to be rejuvenated should we choose, I don't think people realise we have Triumph in our stable, but I struggle to see a place for it . I can't think of anything that is in the production timeframe that would not be wearing a BMW badge - be it 'i' or just BMW."

In 2023, automotive design house Makkina (with permission from BMW) revealed the Triumph TR25 concept car for its 25th anniversary, as well as to celebrate the 100th anniversary of Triumph Cars itself. Based on the BMW i3S, the TR25 pays homage to the Triumph TR2 MVC575 'Jabbeke' of 1953, featuring many design cues from the record breaking car. Speaking with Auto Express, Makkina director Michael Ani stated that the TR25 is intended as a concept, although the BMW platform and powertrain provide scope to bring the car to production should the opportunity arise.

== Triumph car models ==
=== Pre-war ===
| Model Name | Engine | Year |
|---|---|---|
| Triumph 10/20 | 1393 cc inline 4 | (1923–1925) |
| Triumph 13/35 or 12.8 | 1872 cc inline 4 | (1927–1927) |
| Triumph 15/50 or Fifteen | 2169 cc inline 4 | (1926–1930) |
| Triumph Super 7 | 747 cc inline 4 | (1928) |
| Triumph Super 8 | 832 cc inline 4 | (1930) |
| Triumph Super 9 | 1018 cc inline 4 | (1931) |
| Triumph Gloria 10 | 1087 cc inline 4 | (1933) |
| Triumph 12-6 Scorpion | 1203 cc inline 6 | (1931–1933) |
| Triumph Southern Cross | 1087/1232 cc inline 4 | (1932) |
| Triumph Gloria ('12' / '12') Four | 1232/1496 cc inline 4 | (1934–1937) |
| Triumph Gloria ('6' / '6/16') Six | 1476/1991 cc inline 6 | (1934–1935) |
| Triumph Gloria 14 | 1496/1767 cc inline 4 | (1937–1938) |
| Triumph Dolomite 8 | 1990 cc inline 8 (DOHC) | (1934) |
| Triumph Dolomite Vitesse 14 | 1767/1991 cc inline 4/6 | (1937–1938) |
| Triumph Vitesse | 1767/1991 cc inline 4/6 | (1935–1938) |
| Triumph Dolomite 14/60 | 1767/1991 cc inline 4/6 | (1937–1939) |
| Triumph Dolomite Roadster | 1767/1991 cc inline 4/6 | (1937–1939) |
| Triumph 12 | 1496 cc inline 4 | (1939–1940) |

=== Post war ===
| Model name | Engine | Year | Number built |
|---|---|---|---|
| Triumph 1800 Saloon | 1776 cc inline 4 | 1946–1949 | |
| Triumph 1800 Roadster | 1776 cc inline 4 | 1946–1948 | |
| Triumph 2000 Saloon | 2088 cc inline 4 | 1949 | |
| Triumph 2000 Roadster | 2088 cc inline 4 | 1948–1949 | |
| Triumph Renown | 2088 cc inline 4 | 1949–1954 | |
| Triumph Mayflower | 1247 cc inline 4 | 1949–1953 | |
| Triumph 20TS | 2208 cc inline 4 | 1950 | 1 (prototype) |
| Triumph TR2 | 1991 cc inline 4 | 1953–1955 | 8,636 |
| Triumph TR3 | 1991 cc inline 4 | 1956–1958 | |
| Triumph TR3A | 1991 cc inline 4 | 1958–1962 | |
| Triumph TR3B | 2138 cc inline 4 | 1962 | |
| Triumph Italia | 1991 cc inline 4 | 1959–1962 | |
| Triumph TR4 | 2138 cc inline 4 | 1961–1965 | |
| Triumph TR4A | 2138 cc inline 4 | 1965–1967 | |
| Triumph TR5 | 2498 cc inline 6 | 1967–1968 | 1161 UK Spec |
| Triumph TR250 | 2498 cc inline 6 | 1967–1968 | |
| Triumph Dove GTR4 | 2138 cc inline 4 | 1961–1964 | |
| Triumph TR6 | 2498 cc inline 6 | 1969–1976 | |
| Triumph TR7 | 1998 cc inline 4 | 1975–1981 | |
| Triumph TR8 | 3528 cc V8 | 1978–1981 | |
| Triumph Spitfire 4 (Spitfire Mk I) | 1147 cc inline 4 | 1962–1965 | 45,763 |
| Triumph Spitfire Mk II | 1147 cc inline 4 | 1965–1967 | 37,409 |
| Triumph Spitfire Mk III | 1296 cc inline 4 | 1967–1970 | 65,320 |
| Triumph Spitfire Mk IV | 1296 cc inline 4 | 1970–1974 | 70,021 |
| Triumph Spitfire 1500 | 1493 cc inline 4 | 1974–1980 | 95,829 |
| Triumph GT6 | 1998 cc inline 6 | 1966–1973 | 40,926 |
| Triumph Herald | 948 cc inline 4 | 1959–1964 | |
| Triumph Herald 1200 | 1147 cc inline 4 | 1961–1970 | |
| Triumph Herald 12/50 | 1147 cc inline 4 | 1963–1967 | |
| Triumph Herald 13/60 | 1296 cc inline 4 | 1967–1971 | |
| Triumph Courier | 1147 cc inline 4 | 1962–1966 | |
| Triumph Vitesse 6 | 1596 cc inline 6 | 1962–1966 | |
| Triumph Vitesse Sports 6 (US version of Vitesse 6) | 1596 cc inline 6 | 1962–1964 | |
| Triumph Vitesse 2-litre and Vitesse Mark 2 | 1998 cc inline 6 | 1966–1971 | |
| Triumph 1300 | 1296 cc inline 4 | 1965–1970 | |
| Triumph 1300 TC | 1296 cc inline 4 | 1967–1970 | |
| Triumph 1500 | 1493 cc inline 4 | 1970–1973 | |
| Triumph 1500 TC | 1493 cc inline 4 | 1973–1976 | |
| Triumph Stag | 2997 cc V8 | 1970–1977 | |
| Triumph Toledo | 1296 cc inline 4 | 1970–1978 | |
| Triumph Dolomite 1300 | 1296 cc inline 4 | 1976–1980 | |
| Triumph Dolomite 1500 | 1493 cc inline 4 | 1976–1980 | |
| Triumph Dolomite 1500 HL | 1493 cc inline 4 | 1976–1980 | |
| Triumph Dolomite 1850 | 1850 cc inline 4 | 1972–1976 | |
| Triumph Dolomite 1850 HL | 1850 cc inline 4 | 1976–1980 | |
| Triumph Dolomite Sprint | 1998 cc inline 4 | 1973–1980 | |
| Triumph 2000 Mk1, Mk2, TC | 1998 cc inline 6 | 1963–1977 | 324,652 |
| Triumph 2.5 PI Mk1, Mk2 | 2498 cc inline 6 | 1968–1975 | 58,771 |
| Triumph 2500 TC & S | 2498 cc inline 6 | 1974–1977 | 40,656 |
| Triumph Acclaim | 1335 cc inline 4 | 1981–1984 | 133,625 |

== Prototypes ==
- Triumph TR7 Sprint
- Triumph Fury
- Triumph Lynx

== Triumph-based models ==
| Vale Special | (1932–1936) very low built two-seater based on Super 8 and Gloria |
| Swallow Doretti | (1954–1955) |
| Amphicar | (1961–1968) used a Triumph Herald engine |
| Bond Equipe GT | (1964–1967) |
| Susita 12 | (1968–1970) Made in Israel car, manufactured by Israeli Autocars Company LTD. The Susita 12 station wagon, and sedan (named Carmel), used the Triumph Herald 12/50 engine. |
| Susita 13/60 | (1970–1975) Made in Israel car, manufactured by Israeli Autocars Company LTD. Manufactured as 2 doors station wagon, sedan (named Carmel Ducas), and pick-up versions. Built on the Triumph Herald's chassis, and used the Herald 13/60 engine and gearbox. |
| Panther Rio | (1975–1977) based on the Triumph Dolomite |
Fairthorpe Cars
| Saab 99 | used Triumph slant-four engine before the parent company Scania developed its own version of it. |
| Lotus Seven | (1960–1968) the Series 2 had many Standard Triumph parts. |
| Daimler SP250 | used various Triumph parts in its gearbox and suspension, gearbox was a copy of a Triumph unit. |
| Jensen-Healey | Mk. I used TR-6 front brakes. |
| MG Midget 1500 | (1975–1979) Rubber-bumpered Midgets used the 1493cc L-4 and gearbox borrowed from the Triumph Spitfire. |
| Triumph Italia | (1959–1962) Designed by Giovanni Michelotti, the TR3 chassis and mechanical components were supplied by the Triumph Motor Company in the United Kingdom, and built by Alfredo Vignale in Turin, Italy. |

== Badging ==
Globe

Pre-war Triumphs carried a stylised Globe badge, usually on the radiator grille, and this was also used on the first three models produced under Standard's control.

Griffin

Standard had introduced a new badge in 1947 for their own models, first seen on the Vanguard, a highly stylised motif based on the wings of a Griffin. With the introduction of the TR2, a version of this badge appeared for the first time on the bonnet of a production Triumph, while the Globe continued to appear on the hubcaps. This same double-badging also appeared on the TR3 and TR4, the 2000 and the 1300.

However, the original Herald, Spitfire, Vitesse and GT6 models all carried only the Griffin badge on their bonnets/radiator grilles, with unadorned hubcaps.

The TR4A appeared with a Globe badge on the bonnet, apparently signifying a return to the original Triumph badging. This was short-lived, as a policy of Leylandisation mean that neither Globe nor Griffin appeared on subsequent models from the TR5 onwards, or on later versions of the Spitfire, GT6 and 2000.

Leyland

Leyland's corporate badge, a design based on the spokes of a wheel, appeared on the hubcaps of the 1500FWD, and next to the Triumph name on the metal identification labels fitted to the bootlids of various models. It was also used for the oil filler cap on the Dolomite Sprint engine. However it was never used as a bonnet badge, with models of that era such as the TR6 and the second generation 2000 carrying a badge simply stating the name "Triumph".

Stag

The Stag model carried a unique grille badge showing a highly stylised stag.

Laurel wreath

The last versions of the TR7 and Dolomite ranges received an all-new badge with the word Triumph surrounded by laurel wreaths, and this was also used for the Acclaim. It was carried on the bonnet and the steering wheel boss.

== See also ==
- List of car manufacturers of the United Kingdom
- Triumph Motorcycles Ltd
