= Triumph Cycle =

Bicycle manufacturing company

Head badge of a Raleigh built Triumph bicycle

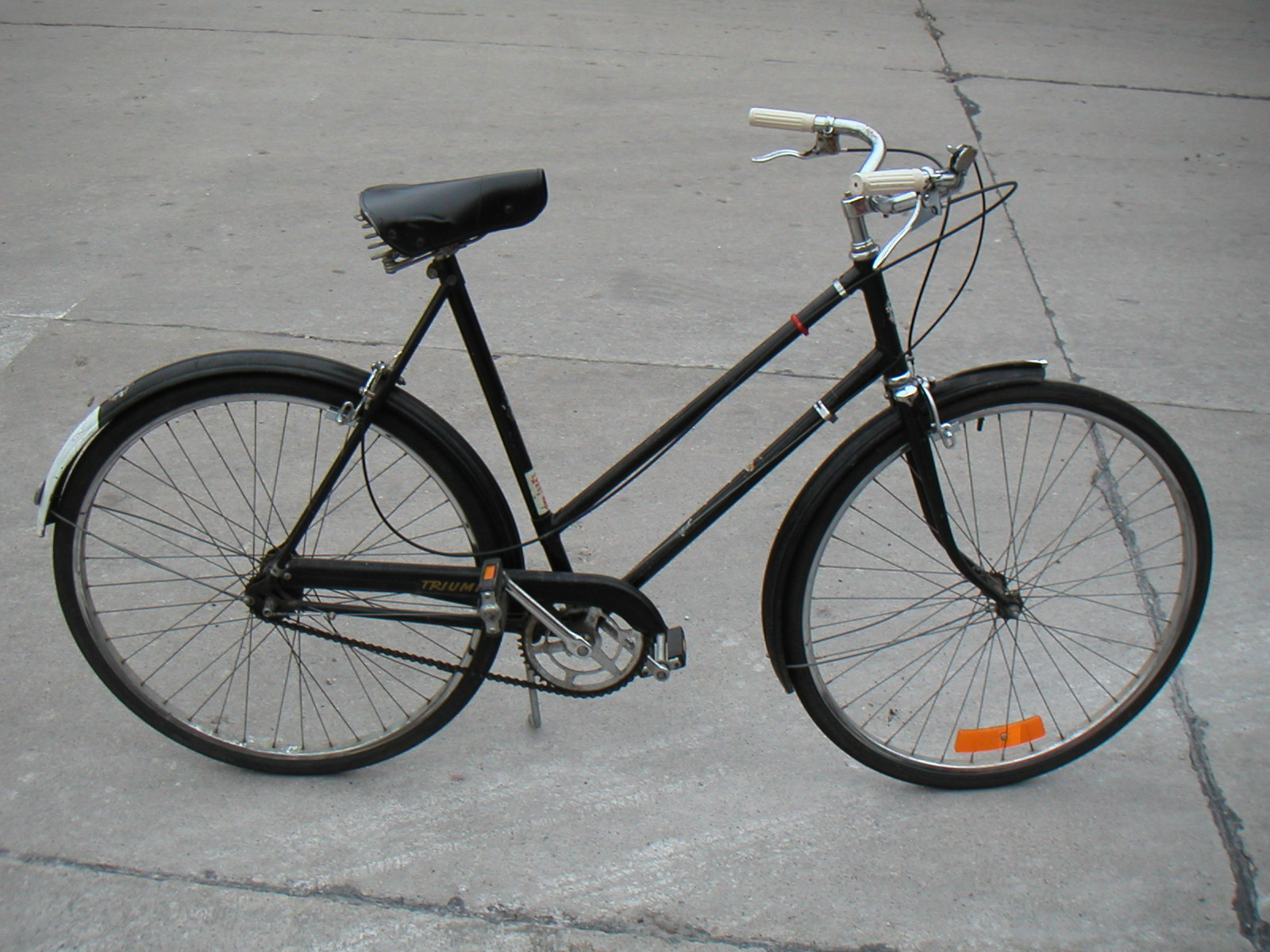
Steel step-through frame sports roadster bicycle with 3-speed internal hub and Brooks saddle

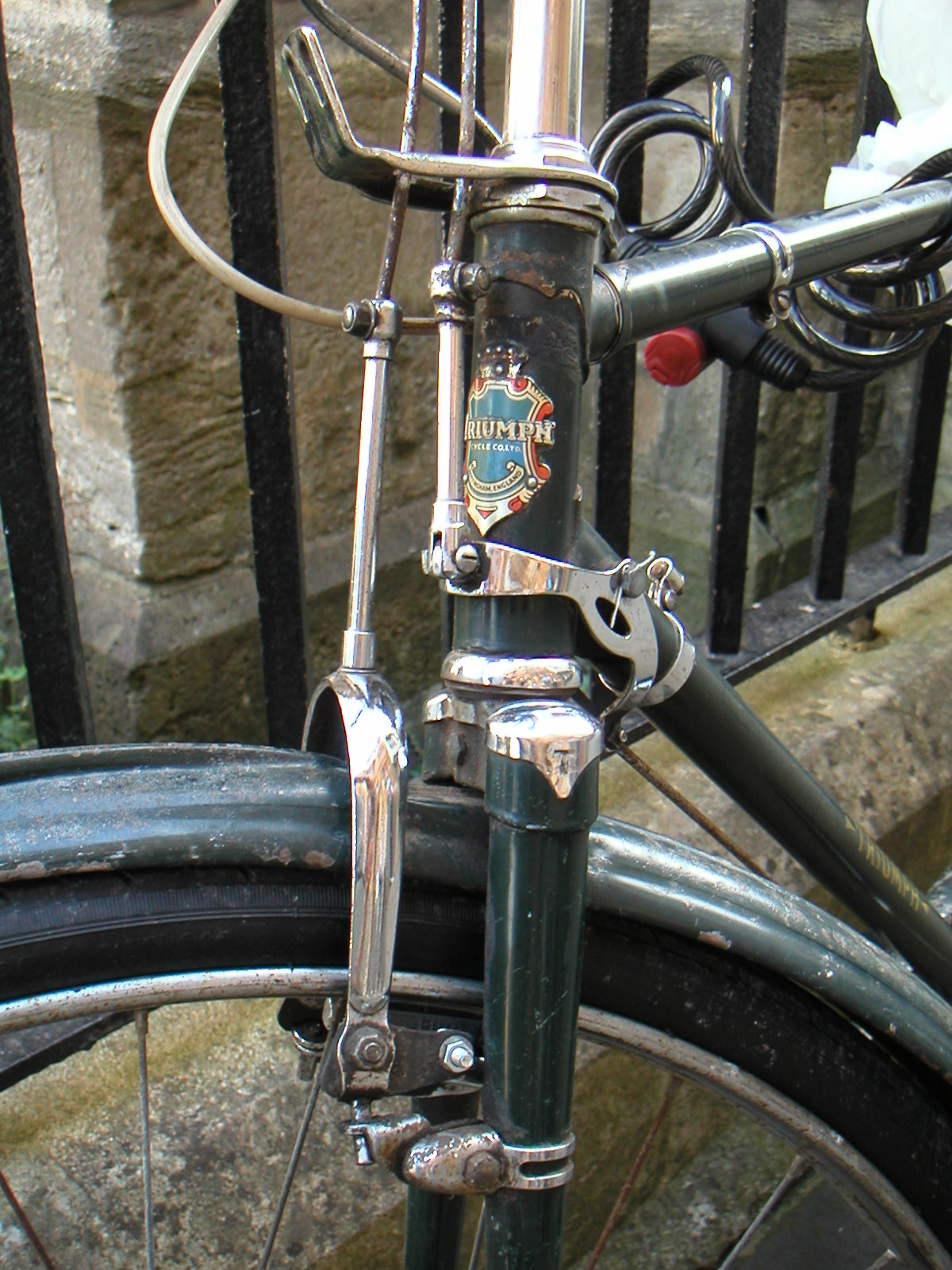
Triumph roadster with rod brakes

Triumph Cycle Co. Ltd., based in Nottingham, England, was a bicycle manufacturing company.

== History ==
The genesis of what would become Triumph Cycle Company began during 1884 when Siegfried Bettmann emigrated to Coventry in England from Nuremberg, part of the German Empire. In 1885, aged 20 years, Bettmann founded his own company, the S. Bettmann & Co. Import Export Agency, in London, England. Bettmann's original products were bicycles, which the company bought from other manufacturers and then sold under its own brand name. Bettmann also distributed sewing machines imported from Germany.

In 1886, Bettmann sought a more general name, and the company became known as the Triumph Cycle Company. A year later, the company registered as the New Triumph Co. Ltd., now with funding from the Dunlop Pneumatic Tyre Company, who were interested in promoting commercial use of pneumatic bicycle tires. That year, Bettman was joined by a partner, Moritz (Maurice) Schulte, from Papenburg. Triumph began manufacturing its own bicycles for sale in 1894.

In 1902, the company produced its first motorcycle, and in 1905, introduced the first all-British motorcycle. Motorcycle production continued until 1982 (see Triumph Motorcycles). During the early 1920s the company also began producing motorcars, and in 1930 the company was renamed the Triumph Motor Company. In 1939 the company was split up with the bicycle division being sold to ACM of Coventry. After the factory was virtually destroyed by German bombing raids during World War II, ACM sold Triumph to Currys who were a well known electrical retailer. After the war, Triumph produced many lightweight sports roadster bicycles, exporting significant quantities to the United States. In 1954, Currys sold the brand to Raleigh, with production in Coventry ending on 30 April 1954 with the closure of the factory (from this date onward, all Triumph bicycles were made by Raleigh at their Nottingham factory, with some later 1970s models being made at their Handsworth plant). In 1955, Raleigh had 72,000 orders in the home market alone to fill, ensuring the continuation of the Triumph brand.

== See also ==
- Triumph Motor Company, a British automobile manufacturer
- Triumph Motorcycles, a defunct British motorcycle brand
- Triumph Motorcycles Ltd, a current British motorcycle brand
- Triumph (TWN), a former German subsidiary
