= Dawson Car Company =

Dawson 11-12

Overview
- Manufacturer: Dawson Car Company
- Production: 1919–1921
- Assembly: Clay Lane, Stoke, Coventry, England
- Designer: Alfred John Dawson

Body and chassis
- Body style: open two-seat open four-seat coupé closed coupé

Powertrain
- Engine: 1795 cc, four-cylinder, overhead-cam
- Transmission: three-speed manual

Dimensions
- Wheelbase: 105 inches (2667 mm)
- Length: 142 inches (3607 mm)

The Dawson Car Company was formed in June 1918 by Alfred John Dawson (1882–1957), previously works manager at Hillman and designer of the 1913 Hillman Nine, and launched in 1919.

The only car made by the company was the 11-12 hp with a water-cooled, four-cylinder 1795 cc overhead camshaft engine coupled to a three-speed gearbox. The bore of the four-cylinder engine was 69 mm and the stroke 120 mm. The wheelbase was 2667 mm. The track gauge was 1,295 mm. The tank held 30 liters. It was available in four body styles, most bodied by Charlesworth, and, unusually, customers could not buy a chassis only. Most were sold in Dawson Blue with black wings. Final production seems to have been in 1921, after about 65 cars were made.

The Dawson cars were expensive, the cheapest being £600 for the two-seater, and could not compete with Morris and Austin. Nearly all the components were made in-house.

In 1921, the Triumph Cycle Company Ltd. bought Dawson's premises and fittings in Clay Lane, Stoke, Coventry, but no further 11-12 models were made.

== See also ==
- List of car manufacturers of the United Kingdom
