= Triumph 15/50 =

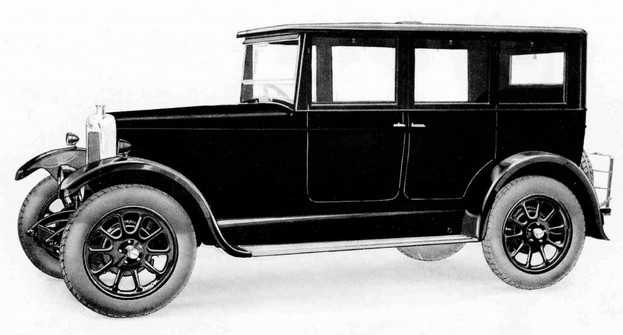

Overview
- Manufacturer: Triumph Motor Company
- Production: 1926 – 1930

Body and chassis
- Body style: 2 and 4 door saloon
- Layout: FR layout

Powertrain
- Engine: 2169 cc side valve I4
- Transmission: Three-speed manual

Dimensions
- Wheelbase: 108 in (2,743 mm)
- Length: 151 in (3,835 mm)

The Triumph Fifteen saloon, or 15/50, was produced by the British Triumph Motor Company between 1926 and 1930. The car used a 2169cc four cylinder Flathead engine, and was along with the smaller engined Triumph 13/35 the first British car to be fitted with four wheel hydraulic brakes, provided by Lockheed Wagner. The brakes were imported from the US, with the axles, and have since proven powerful but ultimately problematic. A three speed transmission was used with centrally located gear lever . The suspension was by semi elliptic leaf springs on all wheels.

The '15' was an export success for Triumph, and c.2,000 were produced during the period, with various body styles coachbuilt. Export markets included Australia and New Zealand.

As of 2012, there are only two known examples left in existence and both have been owned by the same person since 1963 and currently still in the same family as of 2025
