= Triumph 13/35 =

Overview
- Manufacturer: Triumph Motor Company
- Production: 1924–1926; 2500 made (see text)

Body and chassis
- Body style: Five seat tourer Saloon

Powertrain
- Engine: 1,872 cc (114.2 cu in) side valve I4
- Transmission: Three-speed manual

Dimensions
- Wheelbase: 108 in (2,743 mm)
- Length: 151 in (3,835 mm)

Chronology
- Predecessor: None
- Successor: Triumph 15/50

The Triumph 13/35 or 12.8 is a car manufactured from 1924 until 1926 by the Triumph Motor Company in the UK.

It was powered by a four-cylinder 1,872 cc (114.2 cu in) engine of 72 mm bore and 115 mm stroke with single Zenith carburettor which produced 36 bhp (27 kW) .

It was the first British production car to be fitted with hydraulic brakes on all wheels. These were made by Lockheed and were of the external contracting type.

Approximately 2500 of this model and the parallel 15/50 models were made. It was generally priced at about £375 to 495.
