= Triumph Gloria =

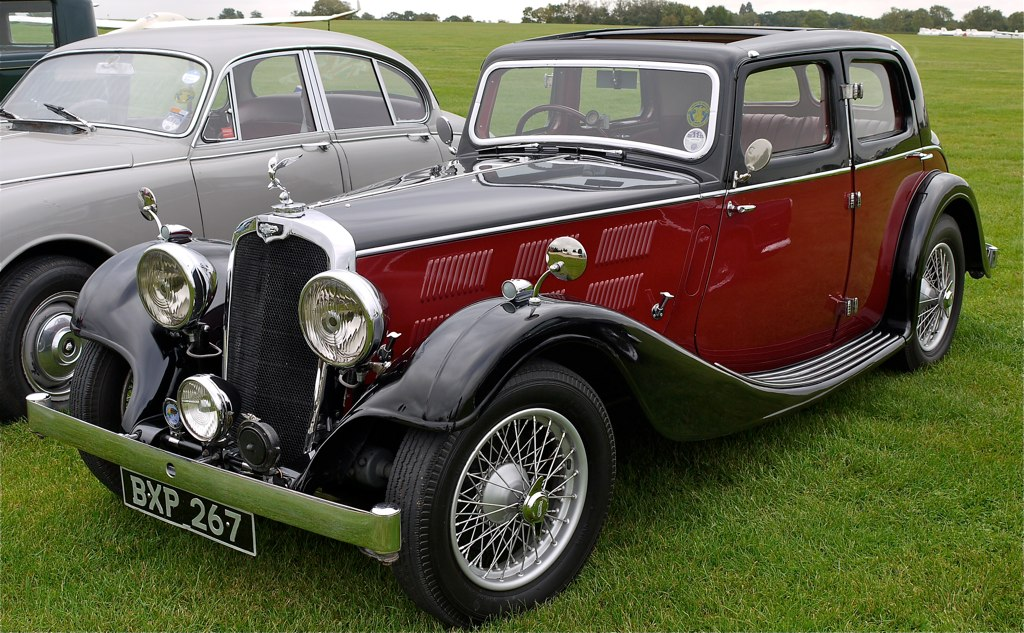
- 1935 Gloria Six 15.7hp; four-door sports saloon

Overview
- Manufacturer: Triumph Motor Company
- Production: August 1933–1938

Powertrain
- Engine: 1087 cc Coventry Climax IOE I4; 1232 cc Coventry Climax IOE I4; 1467 cc Coventry Climax IOE I6; 1496 cc OHV I4; 1767 cc OHV I4; 1991 cc Coventry Climax IOE I6
- Transmission: four-speed

Dimensions
- Wheelbase: Four-cylinder: 108 in (2,743 mm); Six-cylinder: 116 in (2,946 mm); Southern Cross: Four-cylinder: 96 in (2,438 mm); Six-cylinder: 104 in (2,642 mm)

The Triumph Gloria is a range of cars produced by the Triumph Motor Company in Coventry, England, from 1933 to 1938.

== History ==
Between 1933 and 1938 Triumph made a large and complex range of Gloria sporting saloons, coupés, tourers, 2-seater sports cars, drophead coupés and golfer's coupés. All these Glorias, apart from the final two models (1.5-Litre Saloon and Fourteen hp Six-Light Saloon, 1937-1938) were powered by Coventry Climax-designed overhead inlet and side exhaust valve engines, modified and built under licence by Triumph. The Coventry Climax engines consisted of 1087 or 1232-cc four-cylinders and 1467 or 1991-cc six-cylinders.

The chassis came in two lengths, with an extra 8 in (203 mm) ahead of the passenger compartment depending on whether the four- or six-cylinder engine was fitted, and had conventional non-independent suspension with semi elliptic leaf springs. The brakes were hydraulically operated using the Lockheed system with large 12 in (305 mm) drums. A four-speed transmission was fitted with an optional free wheel mechanism allowing "clutchless" gear changing. Synchromesh was fitted to the gearbox on the final Fourteen and 1.5-litre models.

=== Base range ===
The first models in the Gloria range were a 9.53 hp (tax horsepower, 1087 cc) four-cylinder and a 12.95 hp six-cylinder model of 1467 cc, introduced in August 1933. After about 1,850 had been built, the four-cylinder's engine was increased to 1232 cc in August 1934, although the smaller engine continued to be installed in the Gloria Ten Saloon until July 1935. The six-cylinder engine was enlarged to 1991 cc and 15.7 hp at the same time. The new Six produces 55 bhp (41 kW) at 4,500 rpm.

=== Gloria Vitesse ===
From August 1934 to 1936 the Gloria range included "Gloria Vitesse" models (not to be confused with later Vitesses) which were up-rated, with twin carburettor engines and additional equipment. In the case of some of the Gloria Vitesse saloons, they also received slightly different bodywork. The Vitesse Six produced a claimed 65 bhp (48 kW) at 4,750 rpm.

=== Gloria Southern Cross ===
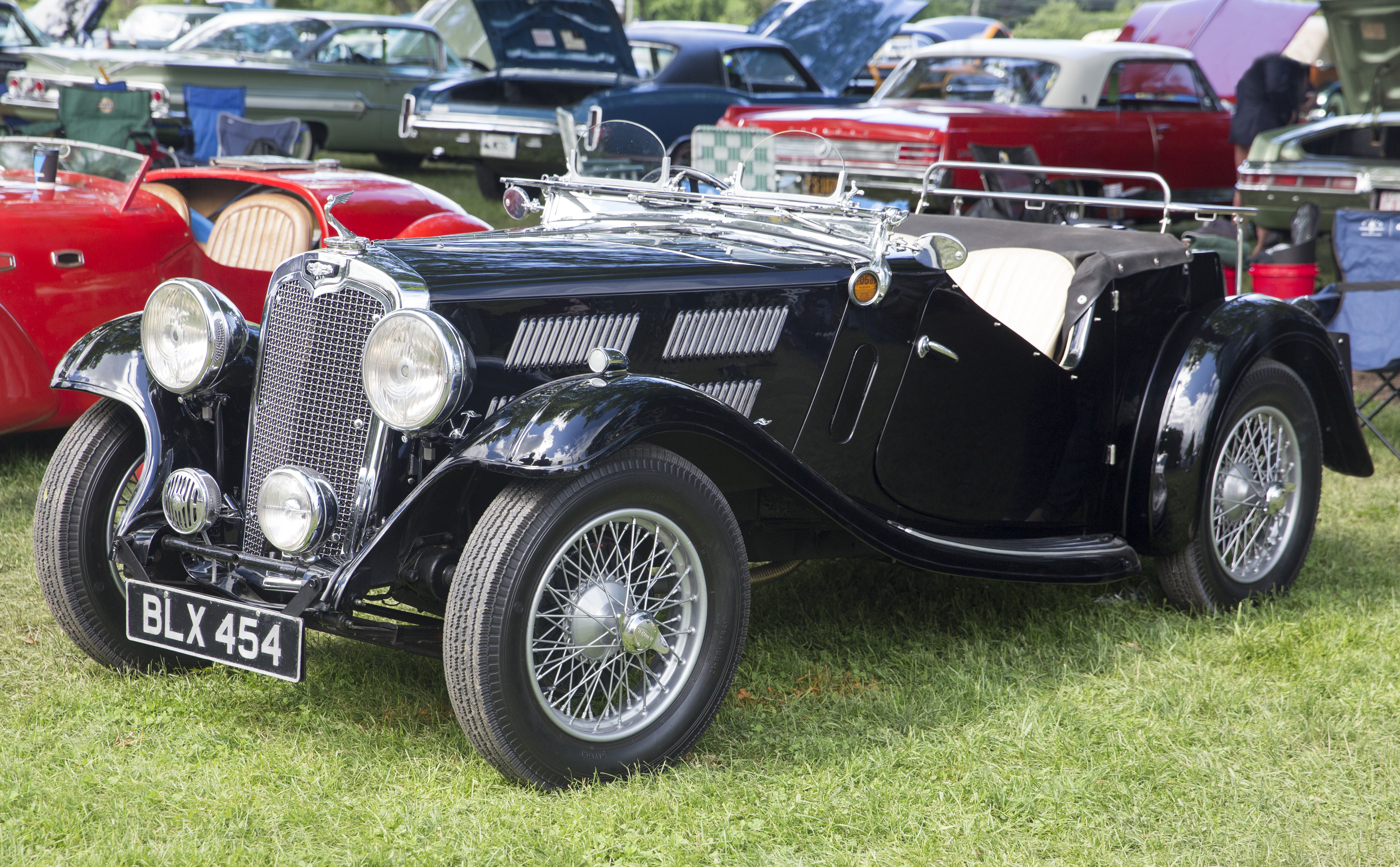
1935 Gloria Southern Cross (10.8 HP four-cylinder)

There was also from 1934 to 1937 an open two-seat sporting model, the Southern Cross, re-using the name previously applied to the sports version of the Triumph Super 9. This used a shortened chassis of 96 in (2,438 mm) for 1232 cc, four-cylinder models and 104 in (2,642 mm) for the 1991 sixes.

== Scale models and die-cast models ==
Lansdowne Models introduced a 1:43 scale model of the 1935/1936 Gloria Vitesse Sports Saloon in 2008.
