= Triumph (TWN) =

German bicycle and motorcycle company

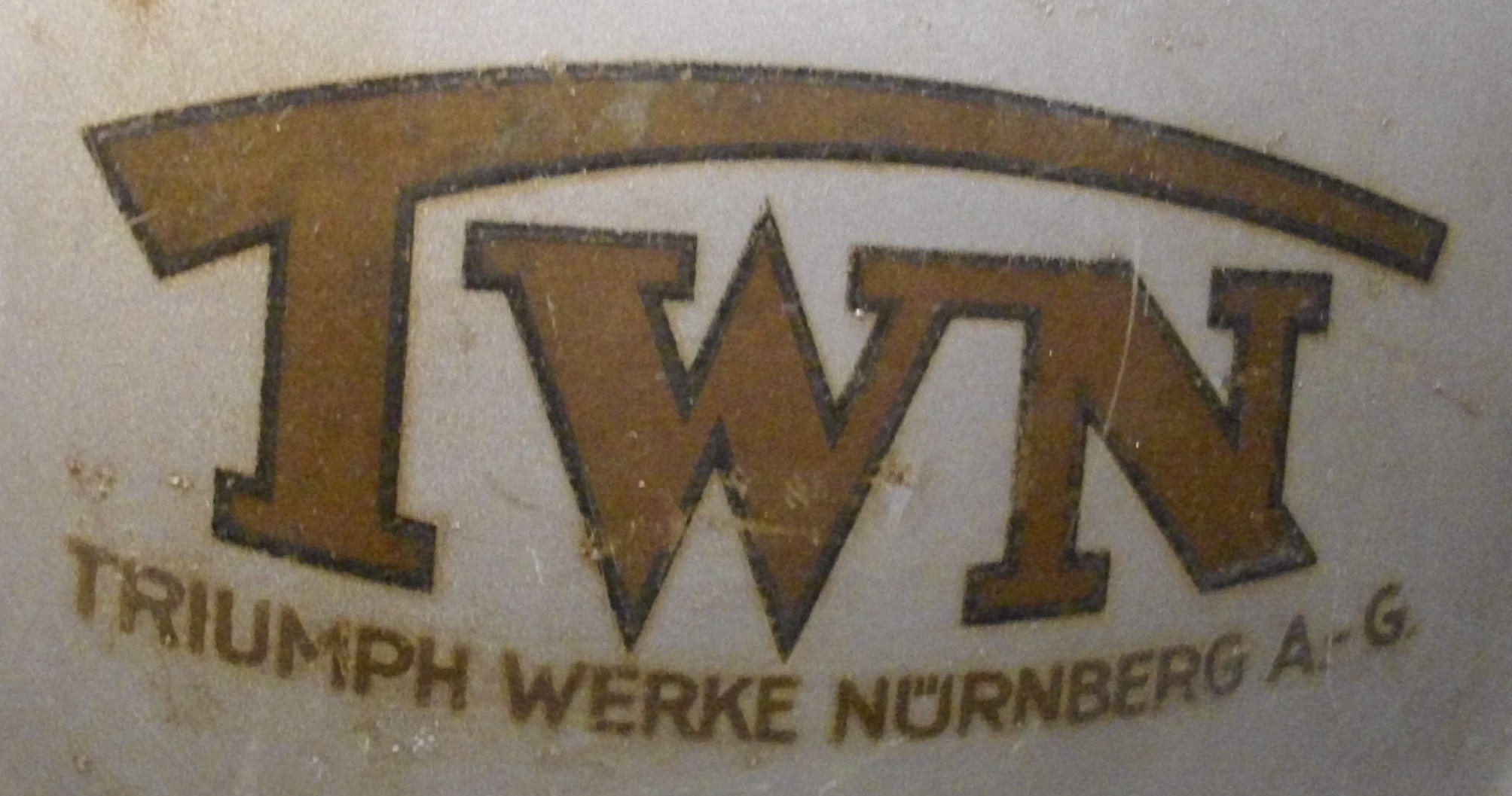
- Founded: 1896
- Founder: Siegfried Bettmann
- Defunct: 1956
- Fate: Taken over
- Successor: Adler
- Headquarters: Nuremberg, Germany
- Products: bicycles, motorcycles

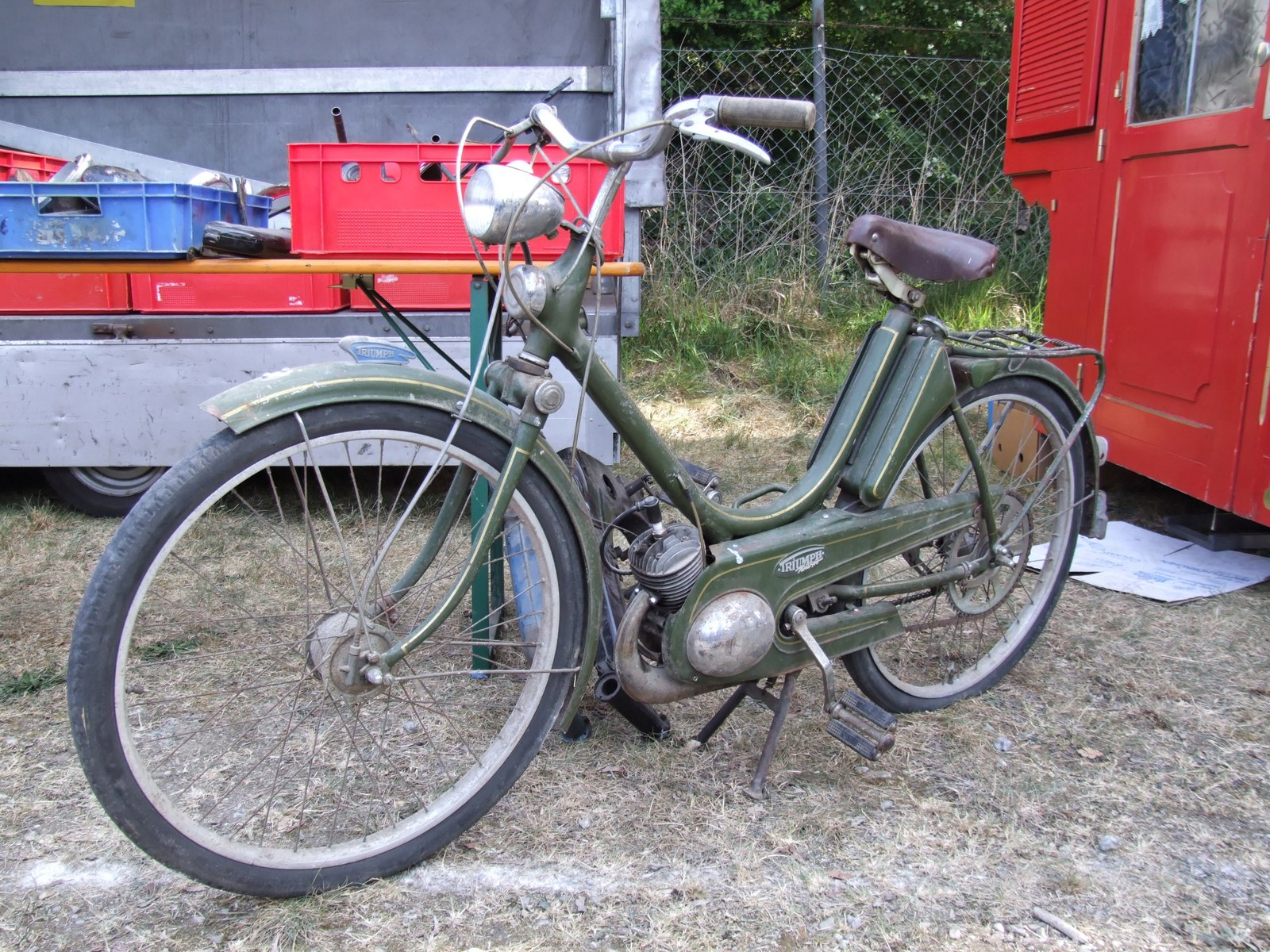
Triumph Knirps moped

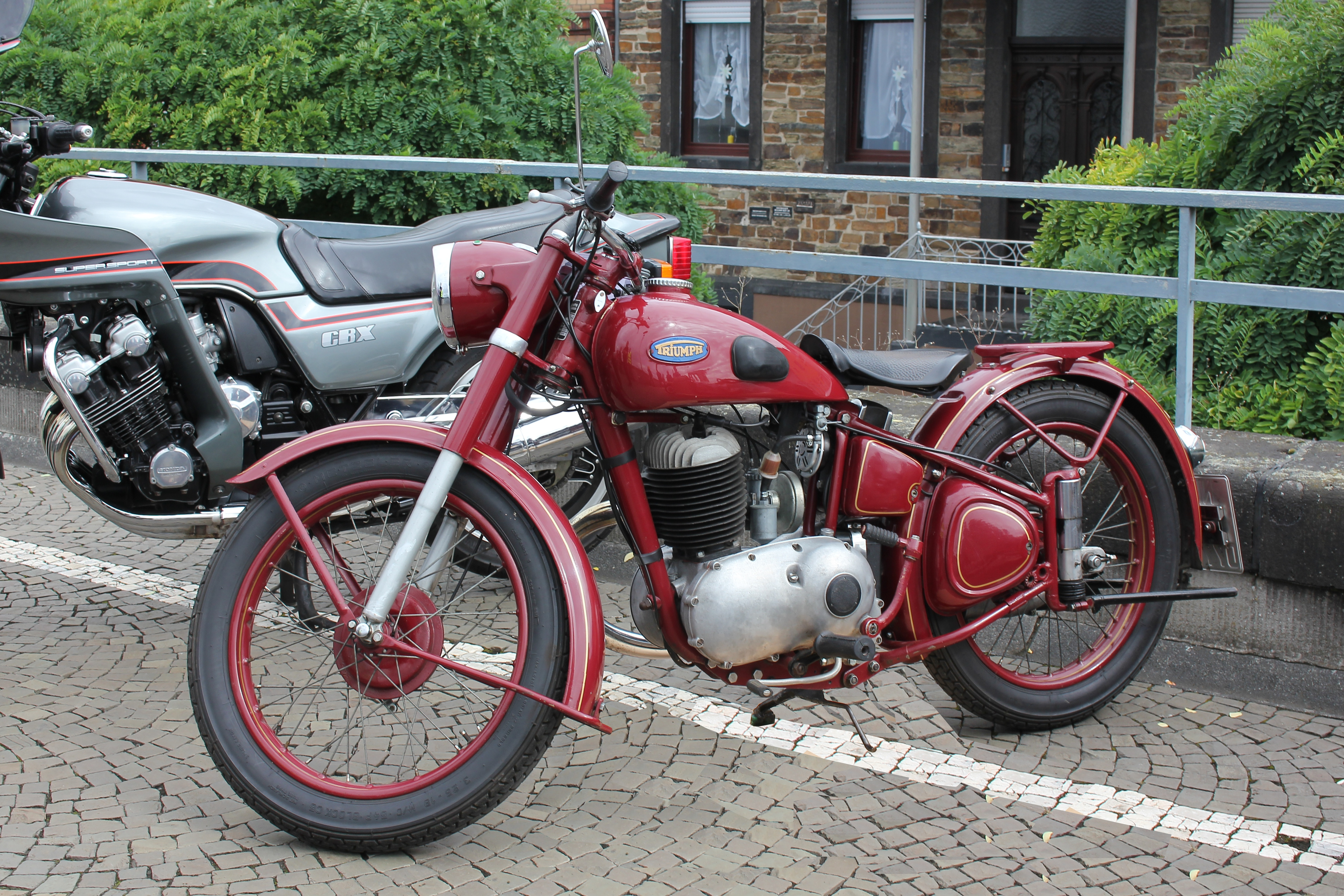
Triumph BDG 250 H, built from 1952 to 1957

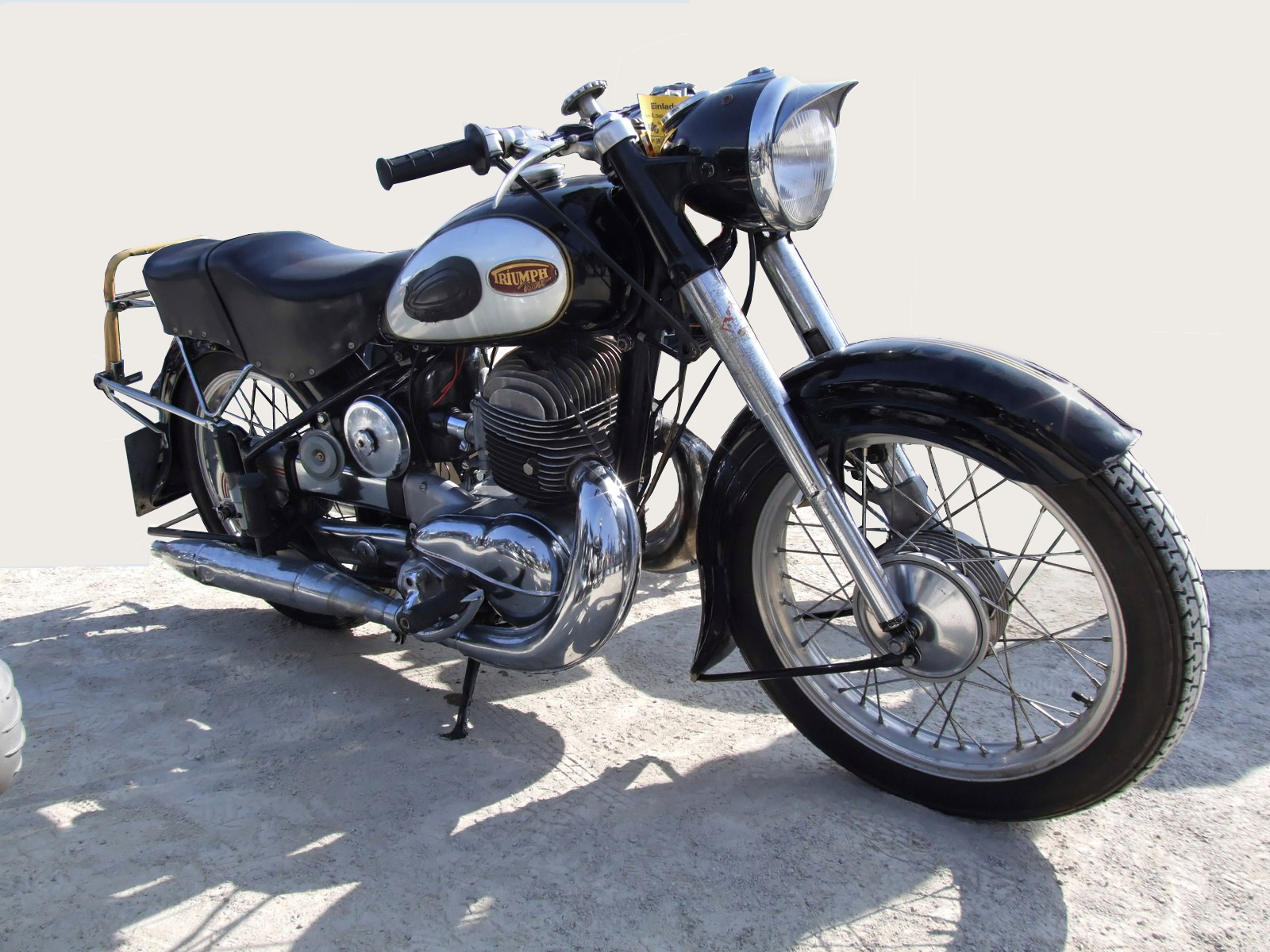
350cc Triumph Boss

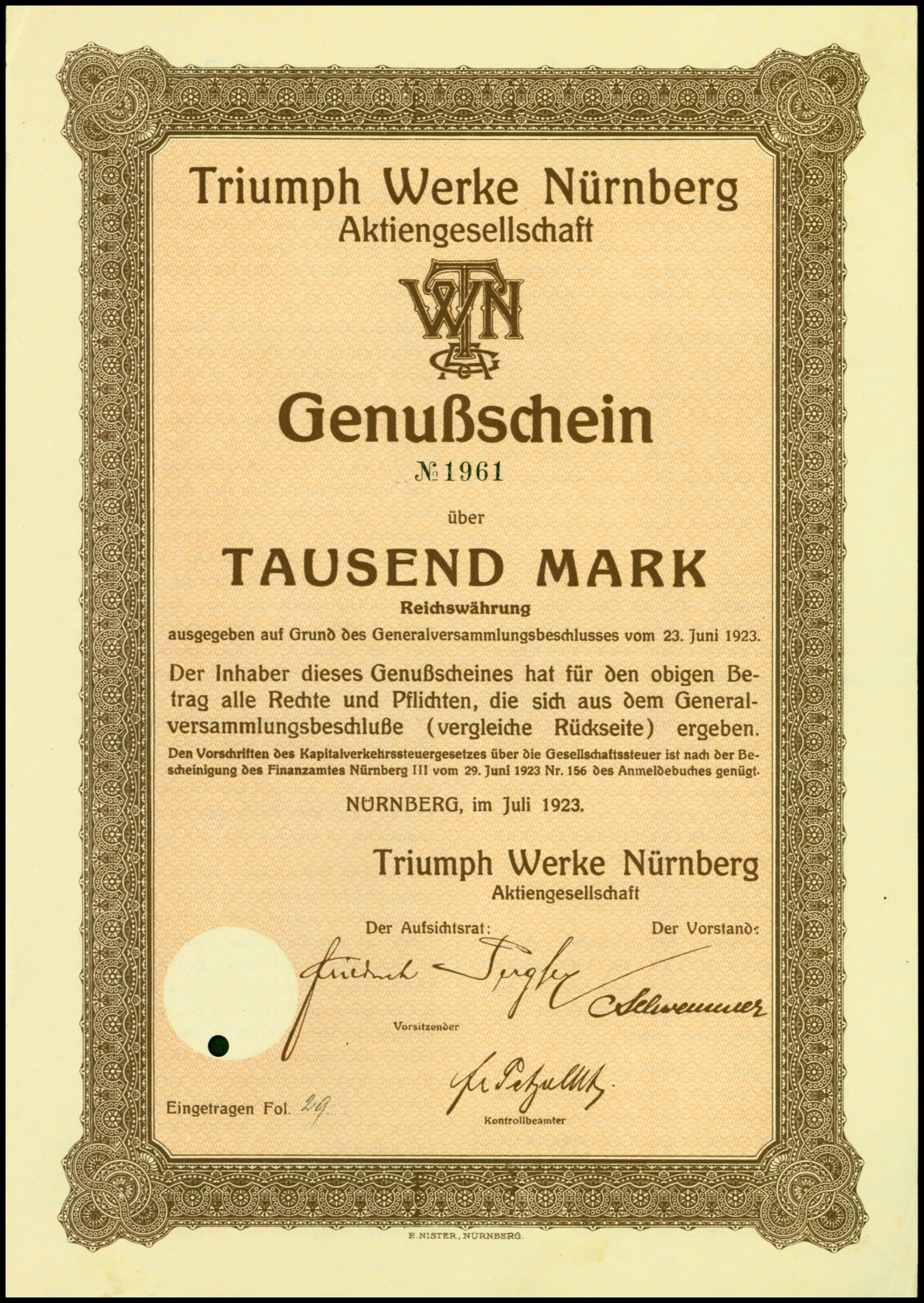
Participation certificate of the Triumph Werke Nürnberg AG, issued July 1923

Triumph-Werke Nürnberg AG or TWN, was a German bicycle and motorcycle company. In 1886, Siegfried Bettmann founded the Triumph bicycle factory in Coventry, England, and in 1896 he founded a second bicycle factory in his native Nuremberg, Germany, under the same Triumph name. Both factories branched out into making motorcycles: the Coventry factory in 1902 and the Nuremberg factory in 1903.

In its early decades the Nuremberg factory produced models with the same 499 cc and 545 cc four-stroke engines as its sister plant in Coventry.

Confusion between motorcycles produced by the Coventry and Nuremberg Triumph companies led to the latter's products being renamed "Orial" for certain export markets. However, in the 1920s there was already an Orial motorcycle maker in Lyon, France, so the Nuremberg motorcycles were renamed again as "TWN", standing for Triumph Werke Nürnberg.

After 1913 the English and German factories diverged, with the Nuremberg works making motorcycles with 248 cc and 269 cc two-stroke engines. After the Second World War Triumph made successful models including the 200 cc Cornet split single two-stroke and the split-single 1 cylinder 350 cc Boss. A split single has one "divided" cylinder (with 2 bores) but only one common combustion chamber and spark plug. Triumph/TWN's production of split singles began with the BD250 in 1939 designed by Otto Reitz. In 1953 a 2 cylinder 250 cm³ single-split model Duplex with 4 pistons was shown at a fair, but not produced.

In 1956 Max Grundig took over the Nuremberg company, merged it with his Adler motorcycle and typewriter business and terminated motorcycle production under the Triumph and TWN names.

== Models ==
List of models which were manufactured in Nuremberg

Typ	Year of manufacture	cubic capacity	Kind of motor	Performance	Maximum speed
Knirps	1919–1923	276 ccm	two-stroke	2,2 kW/ 3 hp	40 mph
KK	1923–1926	298 ccm	two-stroke	2,9 kW/ 4 hp	47 mph
T	1924–1927	550 ccm	four stroke(Coventry)	2,9 kW/ 4 hp	56 mph
T II	1924–1927	499 ccm	four stroke(Coventry)	11,8 kW/ 16 hp	56 mph
S	1924–1926	499 ccm	four stroke (Coventry)	2,5 kW/ 3,5 hp	81 mph
K III (Knirps)	1926–1928	250 ccm	two-stroke	4,4 kW/6 hp	50 mph
K IV	1926–1928	250 ccm	two-stroke	4,4 kW/ 6 hp	50 mph
K V	1926–1928	250 ccm	two-stroke	4,4 kW/ 6 hp	50 mph
K 6	1928–1933	197 ccm	two-stroke	4,4 kW/ 6 hp	44 mph
K 7	1928–1933	197 ccm	two-stroke	4,4 kW/ 6 hp	44 mph
K 8	1928–1933	200 ccm	two-stroke	4,0 kW/ 5,5 hp	44 mph
K 9	1928–1933	200 ccm	two-stroke	4,0 kW/ 5,5 hp	44 mph
K 10	1928–1931	300 ccm	two-stroke	5,9 kW/ 8 hp	56 mph
K 11	1928–1931	300 ccm	two-stroke	5,9 kW/ 8 hp	56 mph
T III	1928–1930	493 ccm	four stroke (Coventry)	11,8 kW/ 16 hp	56 mph
T 4	1928–1930	493 ccm	four stroke (Coventry)	11,8 kW/ 16 hp	56 mph
SSK	1930–1933	346 ccm	four stroke (M.A.G.)	11,1 kW, 15 hp	71 mph
T 350	1930–1931	350 ccm	four stroke (M.A.G.- licence)	7,4 kW/ 10 hp	50 mph
T 500	1930–1931	496 ccm	four stroke (M.A.G.)	9,6 kW/ 13 hp	56 mph
BL 170	1930–1931	170 ccm	two-stroke	3,7 kW/ 5 hp	44 mph
RR 750	1930–1933	741 ccm	two-stroke (M.A.G.)	11,8 kW/ 16 hp	65 mph
KV 200	1930–1934	200 ccm	two-stroke	4,4 kW/ 6 hp	44 mph
KV 250	1930–1934	250 ccm	two-stroke	5,9 kW/ 8 hp	50 mph
SK 250	1930–1934	250 ccm	two-stroke	5,9 kW/ 8 hp	50 mph
RL 30	1932–1935	198 ccm	two-stroke	4,4 kW/ 6 hp	44 mph
Noris 200	1932–1935	198 ccm	two-stroke	4,4 kW/ 6 hp	44 mph
TM 500	1932–1937	500 ccm	four stroke (M.A.G. - licence)	9,6 kW/ 13 hp	59 mph
STM 500	1932–1937	500 ccm	four stroke (M.A.G. - licence)	14,8 kW/ 20 hp	75 mph
Kongress	1932–1937	346 ccm	four stroke (M.A.G. - licence)	6,6 kW/ 9 hp	56 mph
SKL 200	1933–1934	197 ccm	two-stroke	4,4 kW/ 6 hp	47 mph
200 K	1934–1937	197 ccm	two-stroke	4,4 kW/ 6 hp	44 mph
TS 100	1934–1936	98 ccm	two-stroke	2,2 kW, 3 hp	34 mph
B 200	1936–1937	197 ccm	two-stroke	5,1 kW, 7 hp	50 mph
B 204	1936–1939	197 ccm	two-stroke	5,1 kW, 7 hp	50 mph
B 350	1936–1939	346 ccm	two-stroke	8,9 kW, 12 hp	68 mph
S 350	1937–1938	346 ccm	two-stroke	8,9 kW, 12 hp	68 mph
S 500	1937–1938	496 ccm	four stroke (M.A.G. - licence)	14,8 kW/ 20 hp	78 mph
B 125	1939–1949	122 ccm	two-stroke	3,1 kW/ 4,2 hp	47 mph
BD 250	1939–1943	248 ccm	two-stroke	8,9 kW/ 12 hp	68 mph
BDG 250	1949–1957	248 ccm	two-stroke	8,9 kW/ 12 hp	68 mph
BDG 125	1950–1957	123 ccm	two-stroke	4,6 kW/ 6,25 hp	56 mph
Cornet	1953–1957	197 ccm	two-stroke	7,4 kW/ 10 hp	63 mph
Boss	1953–1957	344 ccm	two-stroke	11,8 kW/ 16 hp	75 mph
Knirps Moped	1953–1957	47 ccm	two-stroke	1,0 kW/ 1,3 hp	28 mph
Contessa	1955–1957	197 ccm	two-stroke	7,4 kW/ 10 hp	59 mph
Tessy	1956–1957	125 ccm	two-stroke	5,5 kW/ 7,5 hp	50 mph
Tessy Super	1956–1957	150 ccm	two-stroke	6,2 kW/ 8,5 hp	50 mph
Fips	1956–1957	47 ccm	two-stroke	0,7 kW/ 1 hp	28 mph
Sportfips	1956–1957	47 ccm	two-stroke	0,7 kW/ 1 hp	28 mph

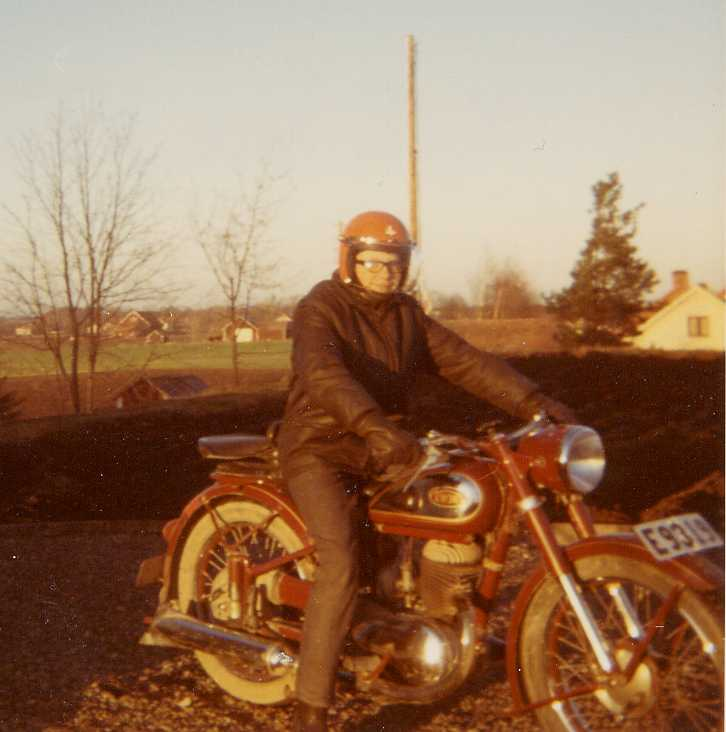
Min TWN från 1953 (1970-talet) /Kjell Alsetun

== See also ==
- List of motorcycles of 1900 to 1909
- List of motorcycles of the 1910s
- List of motorcycles of the 1950s
