= Trigon =

Trigon may refer to:

== Games and puzzles ==
- Trigon (game), a ball game played by the ancient Romans
- Trigon (video game), a 1990 arcade game by Konami

== Music ==
- Trigon (German band), a German-based fusion band
- Trigon (Moldovan band), a folk-jazz band from Moldova
- Trigon, a type of neume, an element of musical notation

== Television ==
- Trigon (Titans episode)
- Trigon (Titans character)

== Other uses ==
- Trigon (comics), a DC Comics character
- Trigon, a code name of Aleksandr Dmitrievich Ogorodnik, a Soviet diplomat who spied for the CIA
- Triangle, a polygon with three sides
- Trigon (Ditson), a 1970 public artwork by American artist Allen Ditson

== See also ==
- Trigone (disambiguation)
- Trigun
