= Donna Troy (disambiguation) =

Donna Troy is a character appearing in DC comicics.

Donna Troy may also refer to:

- "Donna Troy" (Titans episode)
- Donna Troy (Titans character)
