= Koriand'r (disambiguation) =

Koriand'r is a character appearing in DC Comics.

Koriand'r may also refer to:

- "Koriand'r" (Titans episode)
- Koriand'r (Titans character)
