= Crescendo Association =

Progressive rock music organisation

Crescendo Association is a non-profit organisation dedicated to progressive rock music. The Crescendo team organise an annual festival in Saint-Palais-sur-Mer (Charente-Maritime, France), which has taken place every third weekend of August since 1999. The idea is to introduce the audience to progressive rock music and to please its loyal fans whilst focusing on the quality of the performances rather than on a commercial purpose. Festival Crescendo won the Heavent Festival Award for the best small festival in Europe in 2024.

== Historical background ==
Crescendo was created in 1999 by two progressive rock music fans from Saint-Palais-sur-Mer : Sebastien Monteaud and Jean-Claude Adelmand. The first festival welcomed three bands on stage, playing for over five hours in an auditorium in Royan (Charente-Maritime, France). Although the event was very encouraging, Crescendo faced an unsecured future due to financial issues and had to redirect its goal. This is why the current festival is now free and runs over three days in the open air, on the Concié Esplanade in Saint-Palais-sur-Mer, where tourists and fans meet in August. Its increasing success is attracting more people every summer, with between 3000 and 5000 visitors in 2010. The Concié Esplanade turns into a huge stage, welcoming ten progressive rock bands with musicians coming from diverse places, including Ukraine, Canada and countries in South America. For example, in 2009, Antony Kalugin and Valentina Chalaydyuck, from Kharkiv (Ukraine) introduced their band "Sunchild" and travelled back the year after just to be part of the 2010 festival.

The festival hosts workshops for visitors, ranging from topics such as photography exhibitions and fair trade.

== Previous and coming performances ==
1999: Höstsonaten (Italy), XII Alfonso (France) et Drama (France)

2000: Mostly Autumn (Great-Britain), Aëntheos (France), Iconoclasta (Mexico)

2001: After Crying (Hungary), Eclat (France), Iconoclasta (Mexico), Janos Varga Project (Hungary), Quidam (Poland)

2002: White Willow (Norway), Taal (France), R.P.W.L. (Germany), Morrigan (France), Vital Duo (France)

2003: Änglagård (Sweden), Focus (Netherlands), Cast (Mexico), Lord of Mushrooms (France), Nemo (France), Pineapple Thief (Great Britain), Taal (France)

2004: Cabezas de Cera (Mexico), Encore Floyd (France), Flamborough Head (Netherlands), High Wheel (Germany), Christian Richet (France), Universal Mind (France)

2005: Underground Jam (Switzerland), Drama (France), Five Fifteen (Finland), Vrooom (France), Trigon (Germany), Pain of Salvation (Sweden)

2006: Maldoror (France), Hamadryad (Canada), Spaced Out (Canada), S.U.E. (France), R.T.D. (France), Mike Manring (U.S.A.), Crazy World (Finland)

2007: Oxygène 8 (Chile/Mexico/U.S.A.), Lazuli (France), Octopus (Chile), Trettioåriga Kriget (Sweden), Motis (France), Karcius (Canada), Phideaux (U.S.A.)

2008: Flor de Loto (Peru), Cast (Mexico), Hypnos 69 (Belgium), The Black Noodle Project (France), Wicked Minds (Italy), Turzi (France), Psicotropia (Spain), Karcius (Canada), Hawkwind (Great-Britain)

2009: Aisles (Chile), Sunchild (Ukraine), Il Bacio Della Medusa (Italy), Simon L'Espérance Band (Canada), Mörglbl (France), Electric Swan (Italy), After (Poland), Baraka (Japan), Djam Karet (U.S.A.)

2010: Hamadryad (Canada), Moongarden (Italy), Gens De La Lune (France), Sylvan Band (Germany), Il Castello Di Atlante (Italy), Special Providence (Hungary), Mavara (Iran), Kotebel (Spain), The Skys (Lithuania), Motis (France)

2011: The Enid (England), Beardfish (Sweden), Jelly Fiche (Canada), Finisterre (Italy), Eclat (France), Panzerballett (Germany), Holding Pattern (U.S.A.), Gungfly (Sweden), The Last Embrace (France), Stick Drum Duo (Mexico-France)

2019: Julián (France), Yan (France), Karcius (Canada), Akiko’s Cosmo Space (Japan), Gala (Switzerland), Trio (Chili), Zio (UK), Ars Nova (Japan), Mörglbl (France), On The Raw (Spain), Electric Swan (Italy), Frank Carducci Band (France).

2022: Anaid (France), AQ & F (France), Baraka (Japan), Ex'odd (France), Esthesis (France), Amarok (Poland), Pymlico (Norway), Karfagen (Ukraine), Overhead (Finnland), Smalltape (Germany), Last Flight to Pluto (Germany), Universal Totem Orchestra (Italy), Øresund Space Collective (Denmark), Musse Frabery & Musical Companion (Sweden)

2023: Enneade (France), Agusa (Sweden), Space Debris (Germany), Syland (France), G.o.l.e.m. (Italy), Asia Minor (Turkey), Anders Buaas (Norway), Inspierty (Germany), Minimum Vital (France), Tryo (Chile)

2024: La Palmyra (France), Baron Crane (France), Less in Lessie (Poland), Melting Clock (Italy), Sarl Concrete (France), Free Human Zoo (France), Zopp (England), An Endless Sporadic (USA), TNNE (Luxembourg), Lesoir (The Netherlands), The Flower Kings (Sweden)

2025: Booga (France), ! GéRald! (France), Indrek Patte (Estonia), Beardfish (Sweden), Der Neue Planet (Germany), Regna (Spain), HiPoKaMP Projekt (Poland), Traveler (USA), Edenya (France), Vector K (Canada), Hayley Griffiths Band (England)

== "Festival In" and "Festival Off" ==
Since 2004, the Crescendo Association has been running what is referred to as a "Festival In" and a "Festival Off". The first one takes place just before the great festival in Saint-Palais-sur-Mer, whereas the second one takes place a few days after the great festival. Both of them run around Saint-Palais-sur-Mer, in different local towns. With the help of the support of the Regional Council, the General Council, the Cultural Commission, the local towns, the Tourist Office and local shopkeepers, the popularity of Crescendo and progressive rock music in general is increasing {{Citation needed}}. The audience is able to discover or rediscover an "unrecognized type of music", closely liked to that of bands such as Genesis, Pink Floyd, King Crimson, Mike Oldfield, Ange, Led Zeppelin, Yes, Deep Purple and more.

== CRESCENDO in FRENCH GUYANA ==
Between the 21st and 22 October 2011, CRESCENDO GUYANE FESTIVAL took place in Montsinéry-Tonnegrande (French Guiana), and presented six bands which are :

Beardfish (Sweden), Karcius (Canada), Cinquillo (Guyana), Gens De La Lune (France), Special Providence (Hungary) and Komanti (Guyana).
