= Teagan Croft =

Australian actress (born 2004)

- Born: 23 April 2004 (age 22); Sydney, New South Wales, Australia
- Occupation: Actress
- Years active: 2013–present
- Known for: Titans
- Relatives: Penny McNamee (aunt); Jessica McNamee (aunt)

Teagan Croft (/ˈtiːɡən/; born 23 April 2004) is an Australian actress. She appeared as Rachel Azarath / Rachel Roth / White Raven on the DC Universe / HBO Max superhero series Titans (2018–2023) and portrayed the title character in the 2016 science fiction film The Osiris Child. She is currently set to play Princess Rapunzel in Disney’s live-action adaptation of Tangled alongside Milo Manheim.

== Career ==
Croft's career began when she played the part of Scout Finch in a theatrical adaptation of To Kill a Mockingbird when she was nine years old. She garnered enough attention to land the title role in the 2016 film The Osiris Child. That same year, Croft had a recurring role as Bella Loneragan in Home and Away. In August 2017, she was cast as the DC Comics character Rachel Azarath / Rachel Roth / White Raven in the DC Universe series Titans, which premiered on 12 October 2018 and concluded on 11 May 2023.

Croft stars in the movie True Spirit alongside Anna Paquin and Cliff Curtis. It was aired on Netflix in February 2023. The movie is based on the journey of Jessica Watson, an Australian sailor attempting solo global circumnavigation at sixteen years old. In January 2026, Croft was cast as Princess Rapunzel in a live-action film adaptation of Tangled.

== Personal life ==
Croft has two sisters. Her family relocated to Chicago in 2016. She is the niece of actresses Penny and Jessica McNamee.

== Filmography ==
=== Film ===
Year	Title	Role	Notes
2016	The Osiris Child: Science Fiction Volume One	Indi Sommerville	
2022	Bella and Bernie	Bella Judge	Short film; also executive producer
2022	Woman of a Certain Sage	Bella Judge	Short film; also executive producer
2023	True Spirit	Jessica Watson	
2028	Tangled	Rapunzel	Filming
TBA	Override	Becca	Post-production
TBA	Alphas	Jessa	Post-production

=== Television ===
Year	Title	Role	Notes
2016	Home and Away	Bella Loneragan	6 episodes
2018–2023	Titans	Rachel Roth / Raven	Main role

== Theatre ==
Year	Title	Role	Venue	Notes
2014	To Kill a Mockingbird	Scout Finch		
