= True Spirit (film) =

2023 Australian film

- Official poster
- Directed by: Sarah Spillane
- Screenplay by: Sarah Spillane; Rebecca Banner; Cathy Randall
- Based on: True Spirit by Jessica Watson
- Produced by: Susan Cartsonis; Debra Martin Chase; Andrew Fraser
- Starring: Teagan Croft; Cliff Curtis; Josh Lawson; Anna Paquin
- Cinematography: Danny Ruhlmann
- Edited by: Veronika Jenet
- Music by: Nick Wales
- Production companies: Resonate Entertainment; The Rebel Fleet; Sunstar Entertainment; Martin Chase Productions
- Distributed by: Netflix
- Release dates: 26 January 2023 (Australia); 3 February 2023 (Netflix)
- Running time: 109 minutes
- Country: Australia
- Language: English

True Spirit is a 2023 Australian biographical drama film directed by Sarah Spillane and written by Spillane, Cathy Randall, and Rebecca Banner. The film is based on the 2010 memoir of the same name by Jessica Watson, played by Teagan Croft. She is an Australian sailor who was awarded the Order of Australia Medal and is on the Australian Sailing Hall of Fame after attempting a solo global circumnavigation at the age of 16. The film was made available for streaming on Netflix on 3 February 2023.

== Plot ==
In 2009, 16-year-old Jessica Watson dreams of becoming the youngest person to circumnavigate the globe non-stop and unassisted, which means she must sail alone and not dock at any port along the way. The journey is estimated to take 200 days, and she must cross the equator and all Meridians of longitude. Her team consist of her parents, three siblings, and her coach Ben Bryant: a disgraced, former competitive sailor. When on her boat, Ella's Pink Lady, Jessica communicates with the team via satellite phone.

On a test run, Jessica's boat is hit by a 63,000 tonne cargo ship that strayed off course. She didn't notice the oncoming ship because she forgot to turn on her alert system before going to bed. The accident raises skepticism among the media as to whether Jessica can safely achieve her goal. Her parents are also worried, but continue to support her ambitions.

Jessica sets off on her journey from Sydney, and things go smoothly until she encounters her first big storm. Deciding to ride it out, Jessica lowers her sail and retreats to her cabin. The waves are so violent that she is knocked unconscious and doesn't awake until the next morning. Her parents fear she is concussed, but Jessica assures them she's fine and continues her trip.

A period of "dead calm" occurs and Jessica's boat remains stationary for a week. During this time, she suffers from depression and loneliness. She has a heated argument with Ben and cruelly reminds him that, while competing in the New Zealand Millennium Cup, one of his crew members died under his command. He angrily quits the project in response. Jessica's mother encourages her frustrated daughter to lift her spirits by singing David Bowie's "Starman" while looking at the brightest star in the sky.

The wind returns and Jessica continues her journey. She eventually nears Australia and is about one thousand miles from Sydney. Before she can reach home, she encounters three storms that merge. Ben returns and advises her to alter the route, effectively abandoning her official circumnavigation. Jessica refuses to give up and chooses to ride it out. The storm proves to be far more violent than the last one. The Pink Lady capsizes and is thrust 15 feet (4.5 meters) underwater. This sets off the boat's emergency locator beacon, and the team believes Jessica may have drowned.

The Pink Lady, however, resurfaces and rights herself. Jessica informs her family that she and the boat are safe. She returns to Sydney Harbour, 210 days after she left. Her team and a crowd of spectators are there to welcome her home.

The epilogue reveals that Jessica was named the 2011 Young Australian of the Year, has written two books despite having dyslexia, and is still an avid sailor.

== Cast ==
- Teagan Croft as Jessica Watson
  - Alyla Browne as Young Jessica Watson
- Cliff Curtis as Ben Bryant
- Josh Lawson as Roger Watson, Jessica's father
- Anna Paquin as Julie Watson, Jessica's mother
- Bridget Webb as Emily Watson, Jessica's older sister
- Vivien Turner as Hannah Watson, Jessica's younger sister
- Stacy Clausen as Tom Watson, Jessica's younger brother
- Todd Lasance as Craig Atherton
- Ling-Hsueh Tang as Susie

== Production ==
Netflix announced on 16 July 2020 that Watson's memoir True Spirit would be adapted into a feature film, directed by Sarah Spillane. The film is produced by Susan Cartsonis for Resonate Entertainment, Debra Martin Chase for Martin Chase Productions and Andrew Fraser for Sunstar Entertainment. Executive Producers are Suzanne Farwell and Brent Emery for Resonate Entertainment. Co-Producer is Clément Bauer for Resonate Entertainment. Filming took place in August 2021 in Chevron Island in the City of Gold Coast, Queensland, Australia. Restrictions imposed due to COVID-19 pandemic affected the production.

== Release ==
Netflix, per its policy of releasing some of its larger titles for a limited cinematic run, released the film in select theatres on Australia Day 2023 in Australia, and made it available globally for streaming on 3 February.

== Soundtrack ==
""I Made It""

Song by Tones and I
- Released: February 4, 2023
- Length: 4:29

Official video
- True Spirit - Song on YouTube

== Reception ==
On the review aggregator Rotten Tomatoes website, the film has an approval rating of 75% based on 20 reviews, with an average rating of 6/10. On Metacritic, it has a weighted average score of 50 out of 100 based on 6 reviews, indicating "mixed or average reviews".

Simon Foster of Screen-Space rating the film 4 out of 5, praised the director Sarah Spillane and lead actress Teagan Croft writing, "[they] have pulled off the adventurer’s story with all its bewildering reality and existential joy intact." Concluding, Foster wrote, "The production not only deeply respects [Watson's] seafaring accomplishments, but also the legacy it has afforded her name." Nicolas Rapold of The New York Times wrote, "The message of manifesting your goals reigns supreme, which is great, but it’s worth mentioning that Watson’s willpower benefits from the privileges of financial security, family support and a curmudgeonly-turned-selfless coach." Reviewing for The Sydney Morning Herald, Paul Byrnes rated 3 out of 5 and wrote "This is a family-friendly picture, wholesome and tailored for the American market -- although I suspect that director Sarah Spillane also shaped it to inspire teenage girls, in particular. Concluding, Byrnes appreciated Sarah Spillane, writing, "she does a good job within the constraints."

Russ Simmons broadcasting on KKFI-FM (Kansas City) on his show 'Freeze Frame' rated the film 3 out of 5 and stated, "While it’s conventional to a fault, True Spirit is a respectable, family-friendly adventure." Stephanie Zacharek of Time Magazine describes the film as, "Mostly, an anthem of teenage independence and daring". Concluding Zacharek wrote, "True Spirit makes freedom on the high seas look like fun, a far cry from staring at a screen in your bedroom, waiting for your life to begin." Wenlei Ma of News.com Australia rated the film 3 out of 5 and wrote, "True Spirit has its flaws, but there is value in its earnest belief in the human spirit.

=== Accolades ===
Award	Date	Category	Recipient	Result	Ref.
AACTA Awards	10 February 2024	Best Production Design	Michelle McGahey, Bill Booth & Gillian Butler	Nominated	
