= Trigone =

Trigone may refer to:

- Trigone of the lateral ventricle
- Trigone of the urinary bladder
- Hypoglossal trigone
- Olfactory trigone
- Vagal trigone
- Os trigonum, an accessory bone of the foot

== See also ==
- Trigon (disambiguation)
