= Trigon (German band) =

- Origin: Karlsruhe, Baden-Württemberg, Germany
- Genres: Progressive rock, experimental rock, space rock, post-rock, krautrock, stoner rock, jam band, hard rock, instrumental rock
- Years active: 1989–present
- Labels: Face, HeavyZenJazz
- Members: Rainer Lange; Stefan Lange; Tihomir Lozanovski
- Past members: Rudi Metzler
- Website: trigon.in

Trigon is a German-based fusion band, and their history is carved by the numerous changes in line-up which contributed to Trigon's creative potential, as the band draws heavily on jamming as a source for their music. The band has also become a regular attraction at various music festivals. These include the Art-Rock Festival, on the "ProgParade", several times on the Burg Herzberg Festival, and at the Zappanale. Internationally, they were for example at the "BajaProg Festival" in Mexicali (Baja California, Mexico) and at the Festival Crescendo near Bordeaux in France. In 2005 they accompanied Nektar at their European tour.

== Publications ==
=== DVDs ===
- Live 2007 (2007)

=== CDs ===
Studio

- 2011 (2011)
- Emergent (2005)
- Continuum (2004)
- Beschränkte Haftung (2000)
- Nova (1990)

Live

- Burg Herzberg Festival 2004 (2004)
- Burg Herzberg Festival 2003 (2003)
- Burg Herzberg Festival 2002 (2002)

== Other manifestations ==
=== Soundtrack ===
- Hunting Dragonflies (17. June 2005)

by Crimson Chain Productions

- Sonderfahrt (August 2004)

"Bergfilm" of the TU Ilmenau

=== Sampler / remixes ===
- Progstravaganza I-IX (14. June 2013)
- CD to the book of eclipsed ROCK - Das Gesamtwerk der größten Rock-Acts (6. April 2013)
- ProgSphere’s Progstravaganza Compilation of Awesomeness – Part 9 (16. February 2012)
- Eclipsed - The Art Of Sysyphus Vol. 62 (2011)
- Zappanale^{18} Retrospective (2008)

DVD and CD with extracts of some concerts at the Zappanale^{18} 2007.

- CRESCENDO Festival De Rock Progressive Live 2005 Et 2006 (2007)

DVD with extracts of some concerts of the years 2005 and 2006

- Eclipsed - Music From Time And Space Vol. 14 (2005)
- assorted [progrock-dt] related music vol. 1 (November 2004)

Sampler, which collects some in the [progrock-dt] represented bands.

- Portals. Movements. Structures III (July 2004)

CD set arranged by Lew Fisher of the Progressive Music Society

- 23rd Peter - Trigonometrie (February 2004)

"Based on samples from German prog rock band TRIGON, 23rd Peter gives weird lessons in electronic alchemy."

=== Games ===
- CA_DMOilrig - The Oilrig, featuring "Trigon" (2001)

As a member of Chaotic Dreams and as a former member of Trigon, Kirk Erickson put a Trigon Title ("Dekadenz and corruption") in one of his Quake III maps.
