= List of Titans (2018 TV series) characters =

Titans is an American superhero streaming television series created by Akiva Goldsman, Geoff Johns, and Greg Berlanti. It is based on the DC Comics team Teen Titans, a group of young superheroes who join forces in their fight against evil. Created by Bob Haney and Bruno Premiani, the team was popularized by Marv Wolfman and George Pérez, with the series primarily using elements from their comic run.

Starring as the eponymous Titans are Brenton Thwaites as Dick Grayson, Anna Diop as Kory Anders, Teagan Croft as Rachel Roth, Ryan Potter as Gar Logan, Curran Walters as Jason Todd, Conor Leslie as Donna Troy, Minka Kelly as Dawn Granger, Alan Ritchson as Hank Hall, Chelsea Zhang as Rose Wilson, Joshua Orpin as Conner Kent, and Jay Lycurgo as Tim Drake. Cast members portraying enemies of the Titans include Esai Morales as Deathstroke, Vincent Kartheiser as Dr. Jonathan Crane, Franka Potente as May Bennett, and Joseph Morgan as Sebastian Sanger, while allies include Damaris Lewis as Blackfire and Savannah Welch as Barbara Gordon.

This list includes the series' main cast, all guest stars deemed to have had recurring roles throughout the series, and any other guest who is otherwise notable.

== Overview ==
Character	Portrayed by	Appearances				
Character	Portrayed by	First	Season 1	Season 2	Season 3	Season 4
Main characters
Dick Grayson Robin / Nightwing	Brenton Thwaites	"Titans"	Main	Main	Main	Main
Koriand'r Kory Anders / Starfire	Anna Diop	"Titans"	Main	Main	Main	Main
Rachel Roth Raven	Teagan Croft	"Titans"	Main	Main	Main	Main
Gar Logan Beast Boy	Ryan Potter	"Titans"	Main	Main	Main	Main
Jason Todd Robin / Red Hood	Curran Walters	"Together"	Recurring	Main	Main	Main
Donna Troy Wonder Girl	Conor Leslie	"Donna Troy"	Guest	Main	Main	
Dawn Granger Dove	Minka Kelly	"Hawk and Dove"	Recurring	Main	Main	
Hank Hall Hawk	Alan Ritchson	"Hawk and Dove"	Recurring	Main	Main	
Rose Wilson	Chelsea Zhang	"Rose"		Main		
Conner Kent Luthor Subject 13 / Superboy	Joshua Orpin	"Conner"	Stand-in	Main	Main	Main
Slade Wilson Deathstroke	Esai Morales	"Trigon"		Main		Stand-in
Komand'r Blackfire	Damaris Lewis	"Atonement"		Guest	Main	
Barbara Gordon	Savannah Welch	"Barbara Gordon"			Main	
Dr. Jonathan Crane	Vincent Kartheiser	"Red Hood"			Main	
Tim Drake Robin	Jay Lycurgo	"Barbara Gordon"			Recurring	Main
May Bennett Mother Mayhem	Franka Potente	"Lex Luthor"				Main
Sebastian Sanger Brother Blood	Joseph Morgan	"Lex Luthor"				Main
Recurring characters
Angela Azarath	Rachel Nichols	"Asylum"	Recurring	Guest		
Dr. Adamson	Reed Birney	"Hawk and Dove"	Recurring			Guest
Nuclear Family	(Note: Jeff Clarke, Melody Johnson, Jeni Ross, Logan Thompson, and Zach Smadu portray the Nuclear Family.)	"Hawk and Dove"	Recurring			
Trigon	Seamus Dever	"Koriand'r"	Guest	Guest		Guest
Krypto	(Note: Dog actors Digby, Lacey, and Wrigley were attributed to playing Krypto in the second season. In the third season, dog actors Pepsi, Wrigley, and Ziva appear as Krypto.)	"Dick Grayson"	Guest	Recurring	Recurring	Recurring
Bruce Wayne	Iain Glen	"Trigon"	Stand-in	Recurring	Recurring	
Mercy Graves	Natalie Gumede	"Conner"		Recurring		Guest
William Wintergreen	Demore Barnes	"Trigon"		Recurring		
Dr. Arthur Light	Michael Mosley	"Rose"		Recurring		
Jericho	Chella Man	"Aqualad"		Recurring		
Adeline Kane	Mayko Nguyen	"Aqualad"		Recurring		
Walter Hawn	Raoul Bhaneja	"Conner"		Recurring		
Justin Cole	McKinley Freeman	"E.L._.O."		Guest	Recurring	
Drake family	(Note: Ryan Allen, Chantria Tram, and Vinson Tran portray the Drake family.)	"Barbara Gordon"			Recurring	
Margarita Vee	Karen Robinson	"Red Hood"			Recurring	
Molly Jensen	Eve Harlow	"Lazarus"			Recurring	
Bernard Fitzmartin	James Scully	"Lex Luthor"				Recurring
Jinx	Lisa Ambalavanar	"Jinx"				Recurring

== Main characters ==
=== Dick Grayson / Robin / Nightwing ===
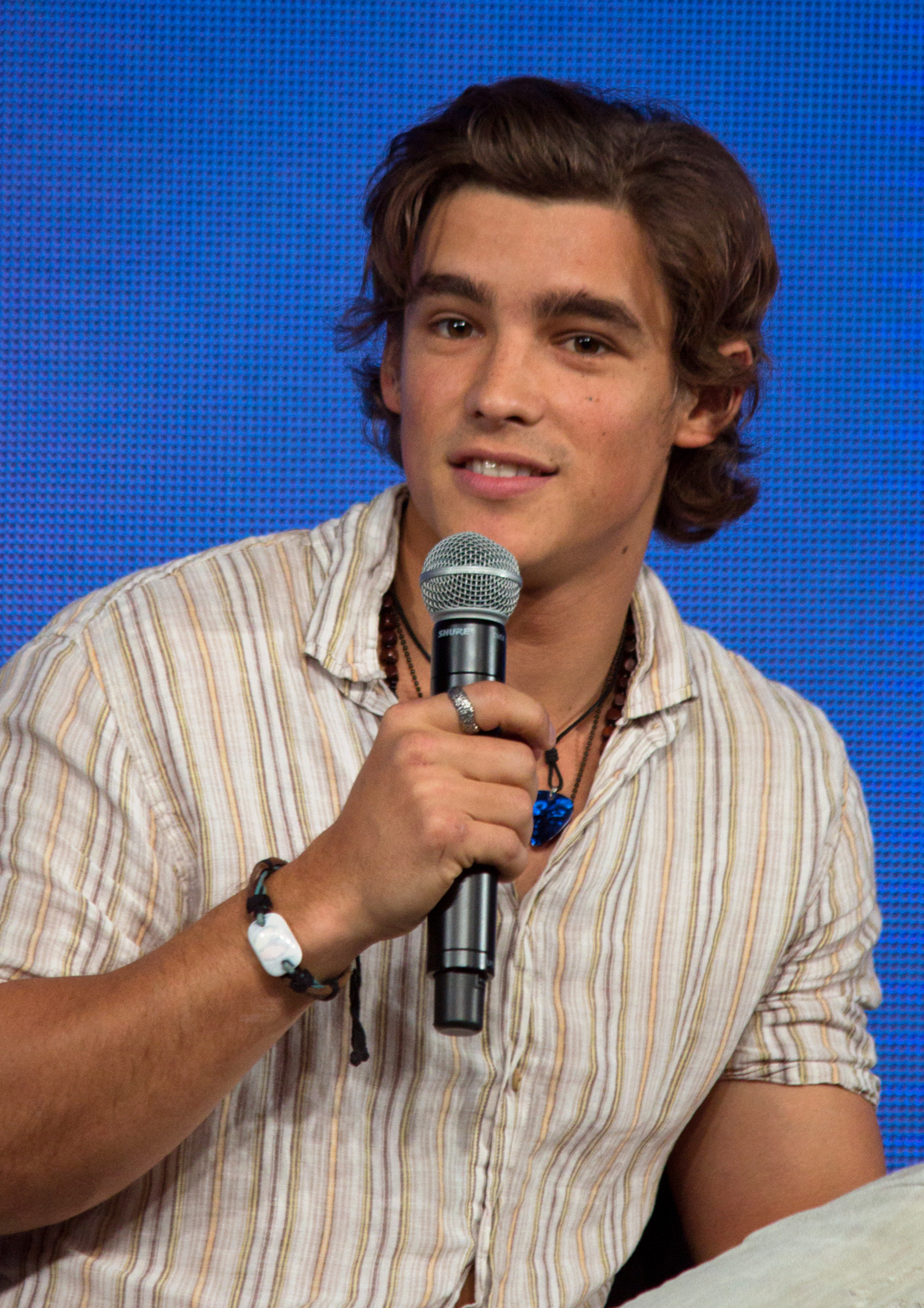
Brenton Thwaites is the first actor to play Nightwing in live-action.

Portrayed by Brenton Thwaites / Tomaso Sanelli and Viktor Sawchuk (young).

Richard "Dick" Grayson is the vigilante leader of the Titans who began his career as the young sidekick to Bruce Wayne. He was originally a trapeze artist with his father John and mother Mary at Haly's Circus until they were murdered by mobster Tony Zucco. Dick was subsequently adopted by Bruce and took up the identity of Robin alongside Bruce's Batman persona. He also formed the original Titans team with Donna Troy. Like his mentor, Dick does not possess any superhuman abilities and instead relies on his physical prowess, gadgets, and tactics to fight crime.

In the first season, Dick leaves Bruce to become a police detective in Detroit and forge his own path. He encounters Rachel Roth seeking his help, which leads to them also meeting Kory Anders and Gar Logan. The four briefly form a team who succeed in defeating the individuals pursuing Rachel and rescue her imprisoned mother Angela Azarath. After they part ways, Dick learns that Angela is league with the same individuals after Rachel. He arrives too late to prevent Rachel's demon father Trigon from being summoned and falls victim to Trigon's mind control.

In the second season, after being rescued by Rachel, Dick leads a new Titans team with her, Gar, and Jason Todd. It is also revealed that Dick was part of an earlier Titans team with Donna, Hank Hall, and Dawn Granger that disbanded when Dick's revenge plot against Deathstroke, who killed their teammate Garth, resulted in the death of Deathstroke's son Jericho. The reemergence of the Titans causes Deathstroke to come out of retirement, forcing Dick to admit to his team that Jericho sacrificed himself to save Dick instead of already being dead by his father's hands when Dick found him. Afterwards, Dick learns that Jericho is still alive, but trapped inside of Deathstroke's body. Taking up the new identity of Nightwing, he leads the Titans in rescuing Jericho and defeating Deathstroke, as well as stopping Lex Luthor's Cadmus Laboratories. Dick then forms the newest team with Kory, Gar, Rose Wilson, Conner, Dawn, and Hank.

In the third season, Dick moves the Teen Titans to Gotham City to investigate Jason Todd's death and the fact that Bruce left Gotham after he killed the Joker.

=== Koriand'r / Kory Anders / Starfire ===
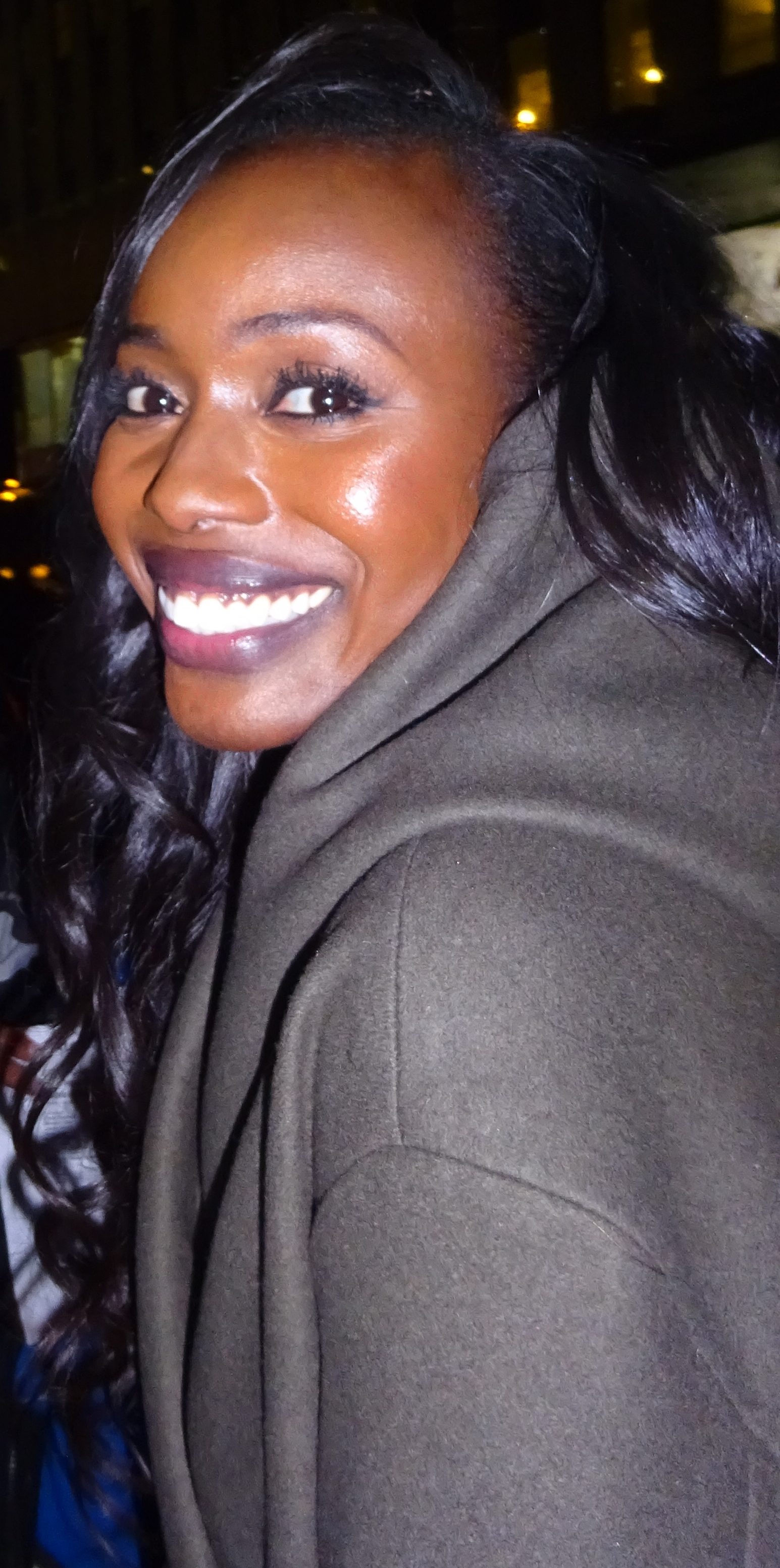
As an immigrant, Anna Diop related to Kory's alien character.

Portrayed by Anna Diop.

Koriand'r, often referred to as "Kory Anders", is an extraterrestrial royal from the planet Tamaran. In addition to having enhanced strength and durability, she can absorb and redirect heat energy, although this causes her powers to be weakened without the sun. Kory begins the series next in line to her planet's throne, despite being uninterested in claiming it.

In the first season, Kory is sent to assassinate Rachel on Earth over fears that Rachel's summoning of her demon father Trigon will put Tamaran in danger. Kory, however, suffers a bout of amnesia that causes her to instead befriend Rachel and join Dick and Gar in protecting her, leading to them rescuing Rachel's mother Angela Azarath. Kory later has her memories restored by Rachel, which allows her to find her spaceship and information on her original mission. This information helps Kory, Dick, and Donna Troy learn about Trigon and Angela being in allegiance with him. Nevertheless, they are unable to prevent Trigon from being summoned.

In the second season, after Trigon's defeat, Kory teams up with Donna to fight crime in Chicago until she is captured by her former bodyguard and lover Faddei. Faddei informs Kory that he was ordered by Blackfire to return her to Tamaran to claim the throne, but Kory escapes him to assist the Titans in fighting Deathstroke. She subsequently learns from Faddei that Blackfire claimed the throne after killing their parents and is now hunting her; Kory is also forced to kill Faddei when Blackfire takes over his body. Although promising to hunt down her sister, Kory prioritizes helping the Titans defeat Lex Luthor's Cadmus Laboratories and subdues their leader, Mercy Graves. During this period, Kory discovers that she is losing her powers, although the cause is left unrevealed.

In the third season, Kory joins the Titans in Gotham City to battle Red Hood. She starts to have strange visions and starts speaking in Tamaranean.

=== Rachel Roth / Raven ===
Portrayed by Teagan Croft.

Rachel Roth is the daughter of the interdimensional demon Trigon. She possesses empathic powers that are capable of causing harm and healing others. Adopted by Melissa Roth shortly after she was born, Rachel begins the series unaware of her true identity and abilities. As a result, she often struggles to control her powers during the first two seasons. The extent of her powers is left ambiguous.

In the first season, Rachel begins to learn about herself while being targeted by Trigon's associates because of her role in summoning him. She seeks the help of Dick Grayson when he appears to her in her dreams and the two team up with Kory Anders and Gar Logan, leading to them reuniting Rachel with her biological mother, Angela Azarath, who is revealed to be in allegiance with Trigon and forces Rachel to summon him under the threat of killing Gar.

In the second season, after defeating Trigon, Rachel joins a new Titans team with Gar and Jason Todd under Dick's tutelage. Although Rachel believes her father is dead, she continues to feel his influence while her powers become more unstable. She helps defeat Lex Luthor's Cadmus Laboratories by using her powers to allow Dick to break Conner's brainwashing. After Donna Troy is killed, Rachel travels to the Amazons' home of Themyscira, believing her powers are capable of bringing Donna back. In her absence, Kory and Dawn Granger speculate that Rachel created an illusion of Bruce Wayne that they witnessed.

In the third season on Themyscira, Rachel tries to resurrect Donna, but fails every time. After her punishment for trying to use her powers that involve stacking some rocks into what they were in before, Rachel eventually comes to the conclusion that Donna can't be brought back and leaves the island. She later reunites with Gar in Gotham City and joins the Titans in defeating Jonathan Crane and transforming the Lazarus Pit into rain that brings back everyone that was killed. Before leaving with the Titans to San Francisco, Rachel uses the Lazarus Pit's dark magic on Crane.

In the fourth season, Rachel starts to experience visions and seizures which include blood and flickering lights. After her battle with May Bennett, Rachel's power is drained by her opponent causing her gem to disappear and her hair to turn white. In episode 6, she regains her powers purified and becomes the White Raven.

=== Gar Logan / Beast Boy ===
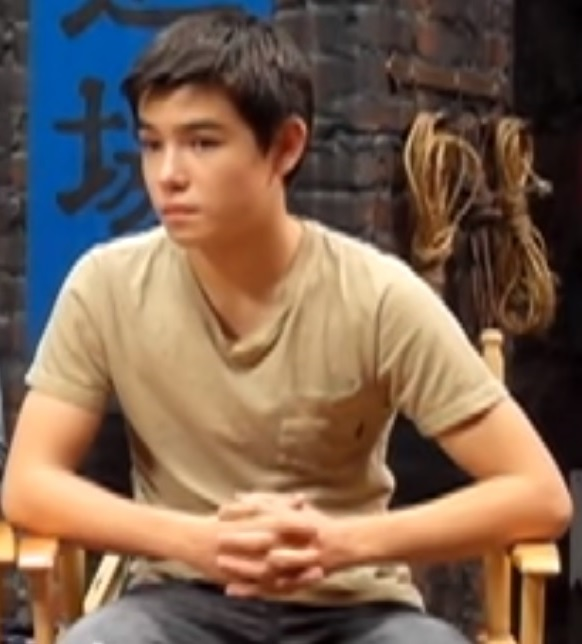
Ryan Potter was a fan of the animated series.

Portrayed by Ryan Potter and Wyatt Lindner (child).

Garfield "Gar" Logan is a shapeshifter who can transform into animals of his choice. He primarily turns into a tiger, his favorite animal. Gar developed his abilities from a drug administered by scientist Niles Caulder, also known as the Chief, to cure him of a lethal disease. The drug saved his life, but also created the side effect of allowing him to alter his DNA into animal DNA. He begins the series living in a secluded mansion with the Chief and other individuals saved by him.

In the first season, Gar encounters Rachel Roth while sneaking out of the mansion and encourages her to live with him. After Dick Grayson and Kory Anders arrive to take back Rachel, Gar's housemates encourage him to join them. He becomes part of a team with Dick, Kory, and Rachel, who defeat those pursuing Rachel and reunite her with her mother Angela Azarath, but Gar ends up poisoned by Angela, who is secretly in league with Rachel's demon father Trigon. To save Gar's life, Rachel is forced to summon Trigon, and Trigon cures Gar of his poisoning.

In the second season, after Trigon's defeat, Gar joins a new Titans team with Rachel and Jason Todd under Dick's leadership. Gar is the only Titan who does not leave their tower after Dick reveals the truth behind Jericho's death, which results in him being left alone to care for Conner. He is subsequently captured by Lex Luthor's Cadmus Laboratories, who subject him to a brainwashing experiment that causes him to turn violent on command. The experiment is intended to increase Conner's bidding rights by pitting him against the brainwashed Gar, but Rachel manages to save Gar as the Titans defeat Cadmus.

In the third season, Gar joins the Titans in relocating to Gotham City in light of Jason Todd's death. He started watching nature documentaries to make himself more than both a human and an animal.

In the fourth season, Gar is given a special super-suit from S.T.A.R. Labs so that he would not have to remove his clothes to transform. When he tries it out, he blacks out before regaining consciousness in the wrecked lab. Gar was told by Bernard Fitzmartin that he became a gorilla, a Velociraptor, and an armadillo. He once became a virus in order to deal with a snake that Mother Mayhem put in Superboy's body. After being asked to be taken to the Red upon seeing a sign during a fight with the Church of the Blood, Gar finds himself emerging in Mount Kilimanjaro where he meets Freedom Beast. He learns what he can from him and the experiment that Chief did with a virus. After entering the Red again, he finds himself seeing the Multiverse, experience a brief trip to Earth-2, other glimpses of Earths, and Freedom Beast nodding at him before ending up unconscious at Doom Manor where he is found by Cyborg.

=== Jason Todd / Robin / Red Hood ===
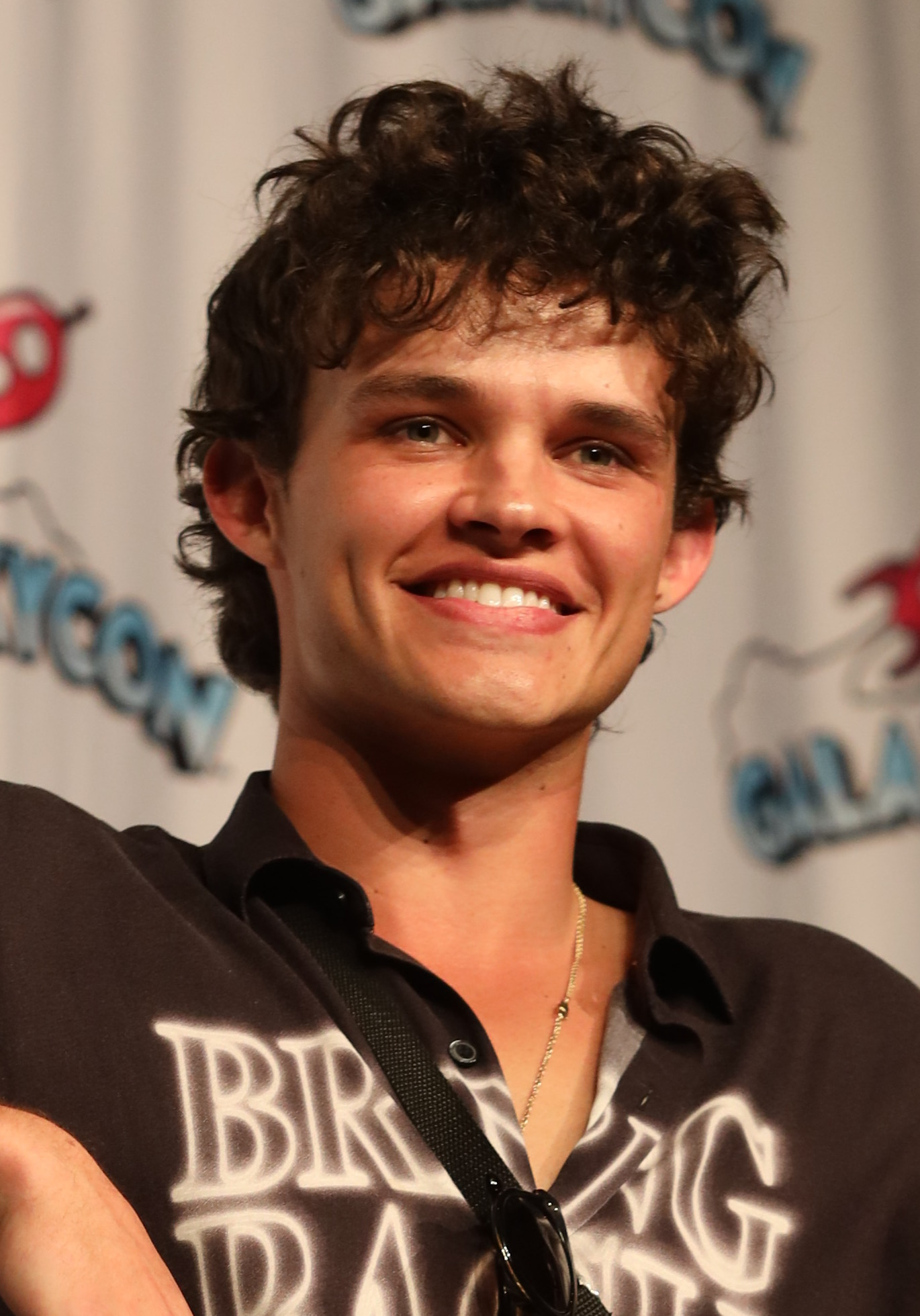
Curran Walters described being challenged by Jason's personality shifts.

Portrayed by Curran Walters.

Jason Todd is a vigilante who becomes the second Robin under Bruce Wayne, succeeding Dick Grayson. A former street delinquent with a troubled past, he took up the mantle of Bruce's new sidekick after he was caught trying to steal the hubcaps from the Batmobile. As with Dick, he compensates for his lack of superpowers with physical prowess and gadgets, but is significantly more aggressive than his predecessor.

In the first season, Jason tracks down Dick to inform him about Nick Zucco, the son of the mobster who murdered Dick's parents, killing Dick's former circus members. The two Robins team up to defeat Nick, although tensions surface between them after Jason brutalizes a group of police officers. Jason is later sought by Hank Hall and Dawn Granger in helping Dick against Rachel Roth's demon father Trigon.

In the second season, after Trigon's defeat, Bruce removes Jason as his sidekick and reassigns him to be part of Dick's new Titans team. Struggling to fit in, Jason pursues the supervillain Dr. Arthur Light on his own, which results in him nearly being killed by Deathstroke. He later leaves the Titans with Rose Wilson, whom he forms a relationship with. The relationship comes to an abrupt end, however, when Rose admits that she was hired by her father to spy on the Titans, causing a betrayed Jason to head off on his own. Jason is last seen watching Donna Troy's funeral from a distance before he again leaves in solidarity.

In the third season, Jason is told by Bruce that he needs to stop being Robin after his second session with Leslie Thompkins. This leads to him visiting Jonathan Crane for a formula in removing fear. Jason goes after Joker and finds him at Amusement Mile. This was an ambush as Joker beats Jason up with a crowbar. His body was later stolen from the morgue by an unknown person working for Jonathan Crane. Jason turns up alive as the Red Hood thanks to Crane dumping his body into a Lazarus Pit. He begins a plan to ruin the Titans and even offers some gang leaders protection while getting half of their proceeds. Eventually, he comes to regret his actions and plans to arrange for the Titans to apprehend Scarecrow which goes south when Tim Drake is shot. After regretting his action, Jason turns against Crane. Upon being offered to help him by a revived Dick, Jason is told that he would not be a Titan again. After making up with Bruce and before he leaves Gotham City, Dick is told by Jason to forward his forgiveness to the rest of the Titans.

In the fourth season, Dick has Jason work with Tim to get a lead on the Organization. He does give Tim some training and has him fighting Shimmer's men when they find Red Hood's lair. When the lead ends up in a dead end, Jason lets Tim return to Dick on one of his motorcycles.

=== Donna Troy / Wonder Girl ===
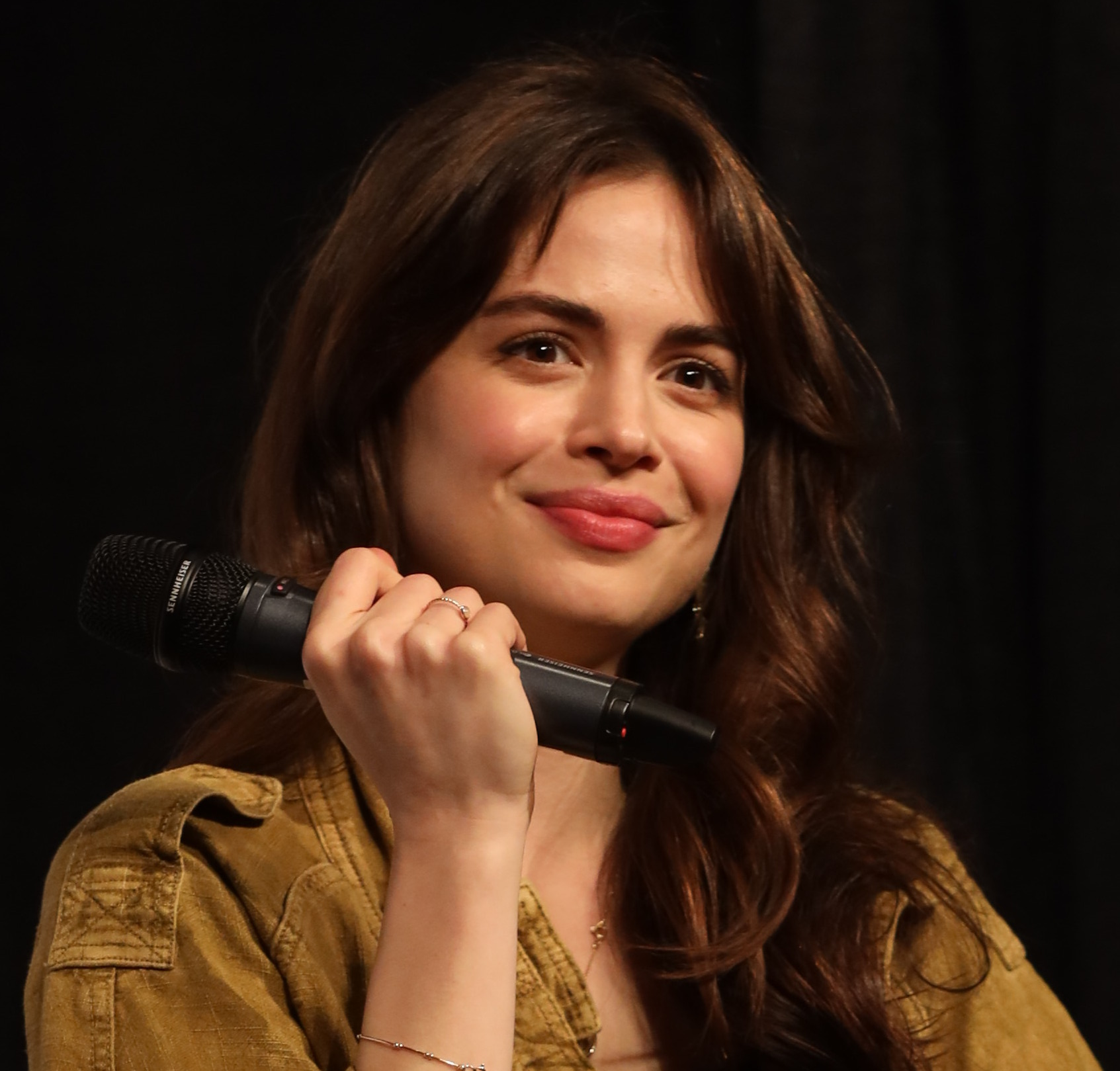
Conor Leslie found Donna to have a sibling relationship with Dick.

Portrayed by Conor Leslie / Andi Hubick and Afrodite Drossos (young).

Donna Troy is a half-Amazon who shares the enhanced physical strength, speed, and durability present in her race. She lived away from the Amazons' home of Themyscira with a human father until he was killed by a fire in their apartment. Rescued by the Amazon, Diana, Donna was taken under Diana's mentorship and became her sidekick, Wonder Girl. Donna also befriended Dick Grayson at an early age due to their mutual status as sidekicks. Their friendship led to them forming the original Titans team.

In the first season, Donna has become an investigative photojournalist, but joins Dick in protecting Rachel Roth when she uncovers that Kory Anders' original mission was to assassinate Rachel. After saving Rachel from a temporarily unstable Kory, Donna discovers information on Kory's ship about Rachel's demon father Trigon, which unveils that Rachel's mother Angela Azarath is in league with him. This revelation, however, comes too late to prevent Rachel from summoning her father.

In the second season, after Trigon's defeat, Donna and Kory team up to fight crime in Chicago until the return of Deathstroke brings Donna back to the Titans' base with original teammates Hank Hall and Dawn Granger. It is revealed that on the original Titans team, Donna had mutual romantic feelings for teammate Garth until he was killed by Deathstroke, setting up a chain of events that resulted in the death of Deathstroke's son Jericho and the Titans disbanding. She leaves the team again after Dick reveals that he had a bigger role in Jericho's death than he previously admitted, but rejoins Dawn, Kory, and Rachel when they learn that Lex Luthor's Cadmus Laboratories has captured Gar Logan and Conner. Although both Deathstroke and Cadmus are defeated, Donna is killed in the aftermath by sacrificing herself to prevent a damaged electrical tower from landing on Dawn and a group of civilians. Despite this, Rachel pledges to bring Donna back to life while her body is being transported to Themyscira.

In the third season, Rachel has been having a hard time reviving Donna. In the afterlife, Donna encounters Tim Drake on a train to his "stop" and follows him off the moving train. When a bunch of ghouls attack to drag them to Hell, they are saved by Hank. Donna was reluctant to return to the living after finding out how to return. When they reach the bridge to the living, Donna takes Tim across while Hank buys them some time. When Donna is revived, Rachel finds her body gone. Donna then appears in England where she saves Bruce Wayne from an attempted fiery suicide. After a brief sparring with Lydia, Donna makes it to Gotham and assists Tim and his family against the police officers on Jonathan Crane's side. Once Crane is defeated, Donna is given a special A.R.G.U.S. card by Margarita Vee. She later mentions to Dick that she is going to visit Dawn in order to forward Hank's message to her.

=== Dawn Granger / Dove ===
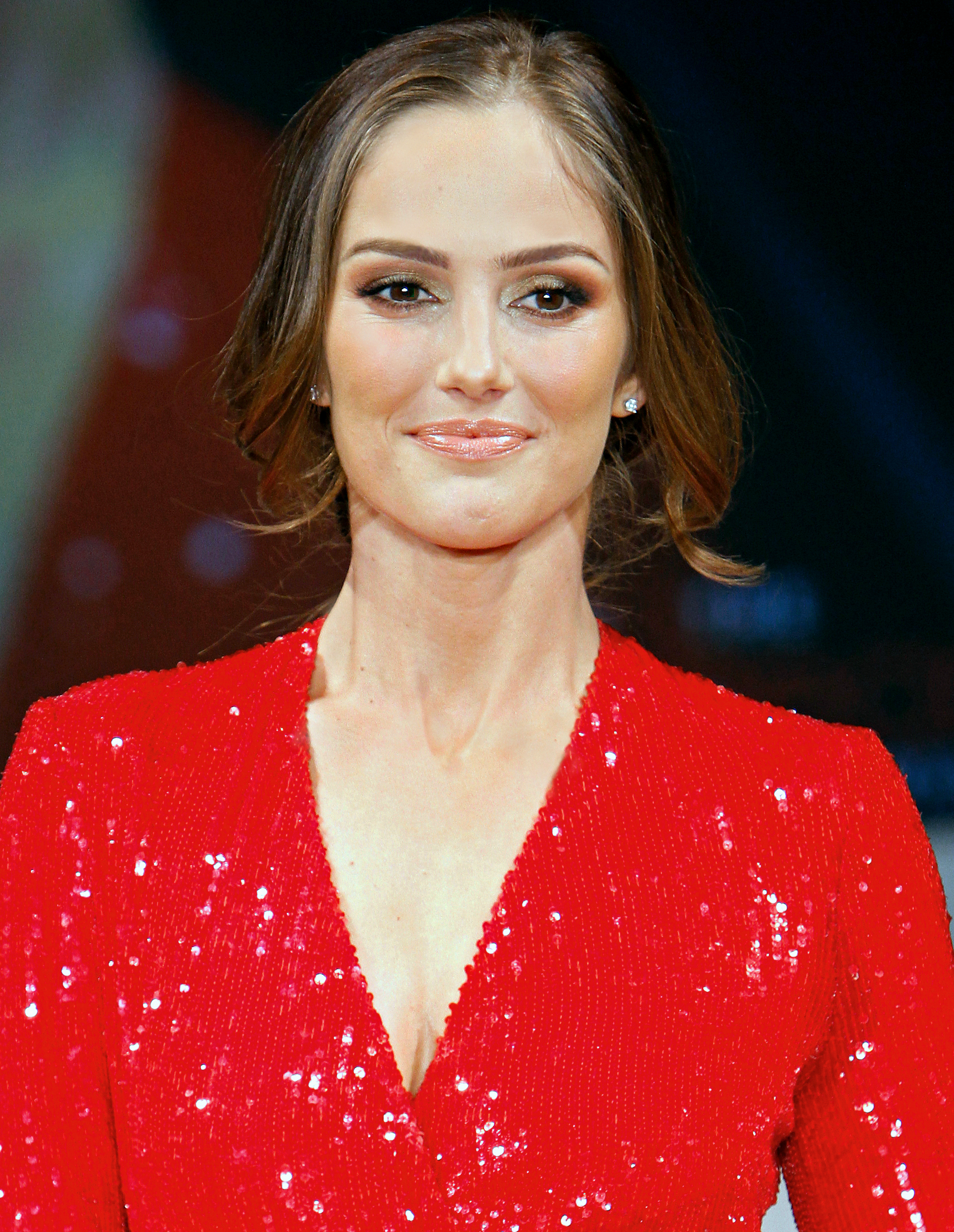
Minka Kelly was promoted to series regular for season 2.

Portrayed by Minka Kelly.

Dawn Granger is the tactical half of the vigilante duo Hawk and Dove, assuming the latter mantle. Her combat experience derives from her background in ballet. She is the second Dove, succeeding Hank Hall's half-brother Don who was killed in the same accident that took the life of her mother Marie. Dawn was also a member of the original Titans. Although in a relationship with Hank at the start of the series, she was previously dating Dick Grayson on the original Titans team, creating lingering tensions between the three.

In the first season, Dawn is sought by Dick to look after Rachel Roth while she and Hank are planning to retire. The four are later ambushed by the Nuclear Family, who throw Dawn from a building. Dawn is left comatose from the attack until she receives a message from to Rachel to find Jason Todd to help Dick defeat Rachel's demon father Trigon.

In the second season, after Trigon's defeat, Dawn and Hank have retired to a farm in Wyoming, although Dawn continues to operate as Dove. The return of Deathstroke forces them back into the Titans, but they leave again after Dick admits that he had a bigger role in the death of Deathstroke's son Jericho than he had previously told them. After Hank breaks up with Dawn, she rejoins Donna Troy, Kory Anders, and Rachel to rescue Gar Logan and Conner from Lex Luthor's Cadmus Laboratories. In the aftermath of Deathstroke's and Cadmus's defeats, she is left with lingering guilt over Donna sacrificing herself to save her. She ultimately agrees to rejoin Hank as Hawk and Dove without being romantically entangled.

In the third season, Dawn joins the Titans in relocating to Gotham City in light of Jason Todd's death. When it was discovered that Jason turned up alive as Red Hood, Dawn gives into the deal Jason made with Dick to obtain some gold bars from an armored truck in order to get the deactivator for the bomb that Red Hood placed on Hank's chest. Due to a trick from Red Hood, the gun that Jason wanted Dawn to shoot him with was the real activator as the bomb on Hank goes off before Superboy can reach him with a deactivator. This trickery left Dawn devastated as Dick comforts her. Afterwards, Dawn tells Dick that she is leaving for Paris to bunk at her family's house there for a while.

=== Hank Hall / Hawk ===
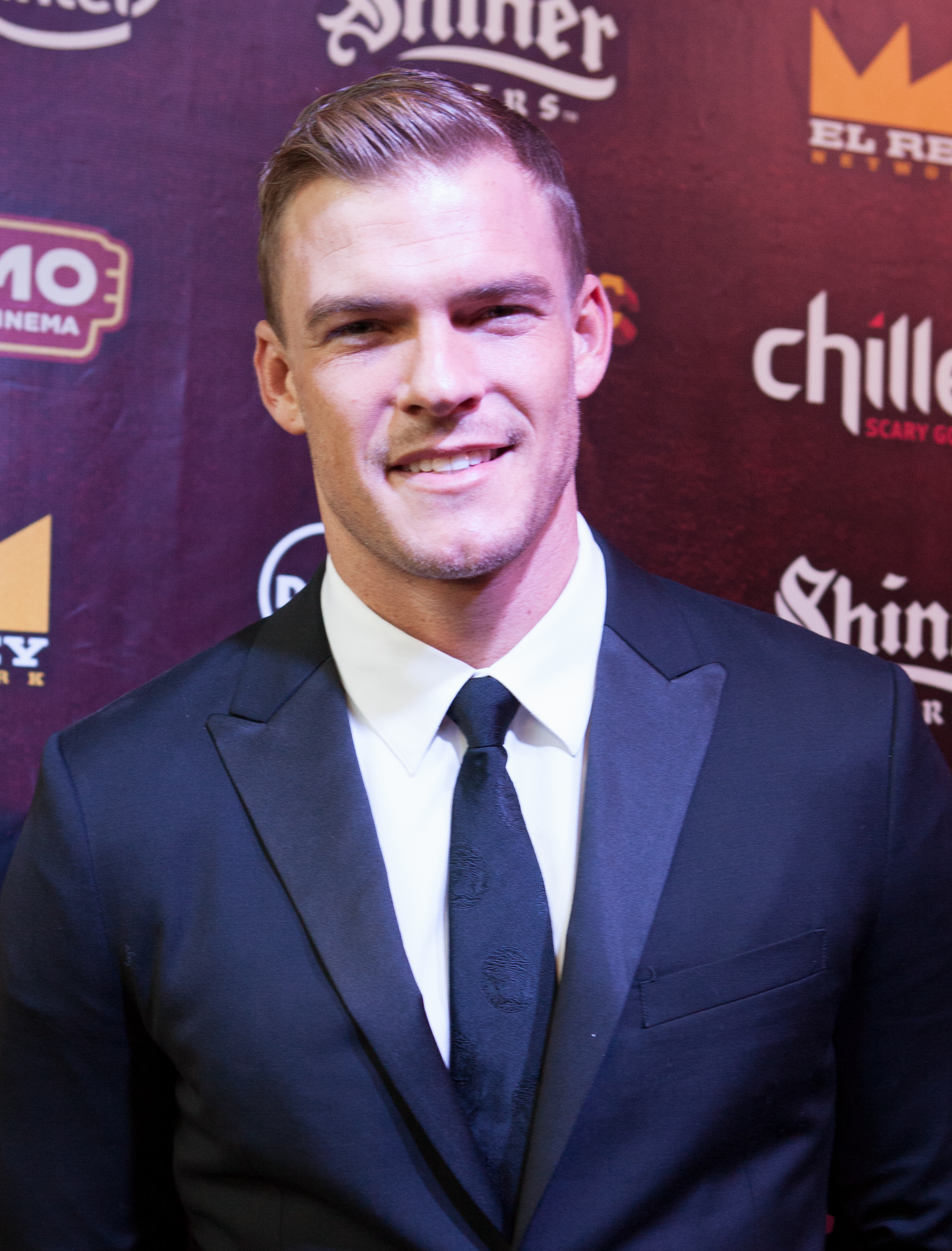
Alan Ritchson almost declined his role because he played Aquaman on Smallville.

Portrayed by Alan Ritchson and Tait Blum (young).

Hank Hall is the aggressive half of the vigilante duo Hawk and Dove, assuming the former mantle. He took up crimefighting due to sexual abuse he suffered from his football coach Vincent, with his combat background deriving from his experience as a football tight end. Hank was originally teamed with his half-brother Don until Don was killed in the same accident that killed Dawn Granger's mother Marie. This led to Hank and Dawn meeting through the same grief support group and becoming the new Hawk and Dove team. He and Dawn have had an on-and-off-relationship, with Dawn dating Dick Grayson while they were all part of the original Titans team, causing lingering tension.

In the first season, Hank is plotting his retirement with Dawn when Dick returns to have them look after Rachel Roth. Before further conflict can surface between Hank and Dick, the four are attacked by the Nuclear Family in a battle that leaves Dawn comatose. Hank remains by Dawn's side until she awakens and informs him that they need to find Jason Todd in helping Dick defeat Rachel's demon father Trigon.

In the second season, after Trigon's defeat, Hank and Dawn have retired to farm in Wyoming until Deathstroke's return forces them back to the Titans. They leave again once Dick reveals his bigger role in the death of Deathstroke's son Jericho, only for Hank to break up with Dawn over a belief that they only cause others harm while they are together. He ends up relapsing into drug addiction while working as a cage fighter, but returns to help Dawn against Lex Luthor's Cadmus Laboratories, and the two agree after Deathstroke's and Cadmus' defeats to continue as Hawk and Dove without being in a romantic relationship.

In the third season, Hank was seen as a bicycle-riding police officer in Washington DC when he hears that Dawn and the rest of the Titans are in Gotham City. When he tries to confront Red Hood, he gets subdued and gets a Wayne Enterprise bomb placed on his chest. While Superboy works on a deactivator, Dawn tries to take care of Hank as he starts to prepare for the worst. Due to a trick by Red Hood, Dawn pulls the trigger on the gun that Red Hood lied about shooting him with causing the bomb to go off on Hank before Superboy can reach him with the deactivator. Hank's death left Dawn devastated. When Tim Drake and Donna Troy were in the afterlife, Hank saves them from the ghouls that plan to drag them to Hell. Using some information he obtained, Hank takes them to an upside down tree where a bridge back to the living is. During the next attack by the ghouls, Hank buys them time to get away when the bridge starts breaking while having Donna forward a message to Dawn. After fighting off the ghouls, Hank is reunited with Don as they work to keep people safe from the ghouls.

=== Slade Wilson / Deathstroke ===
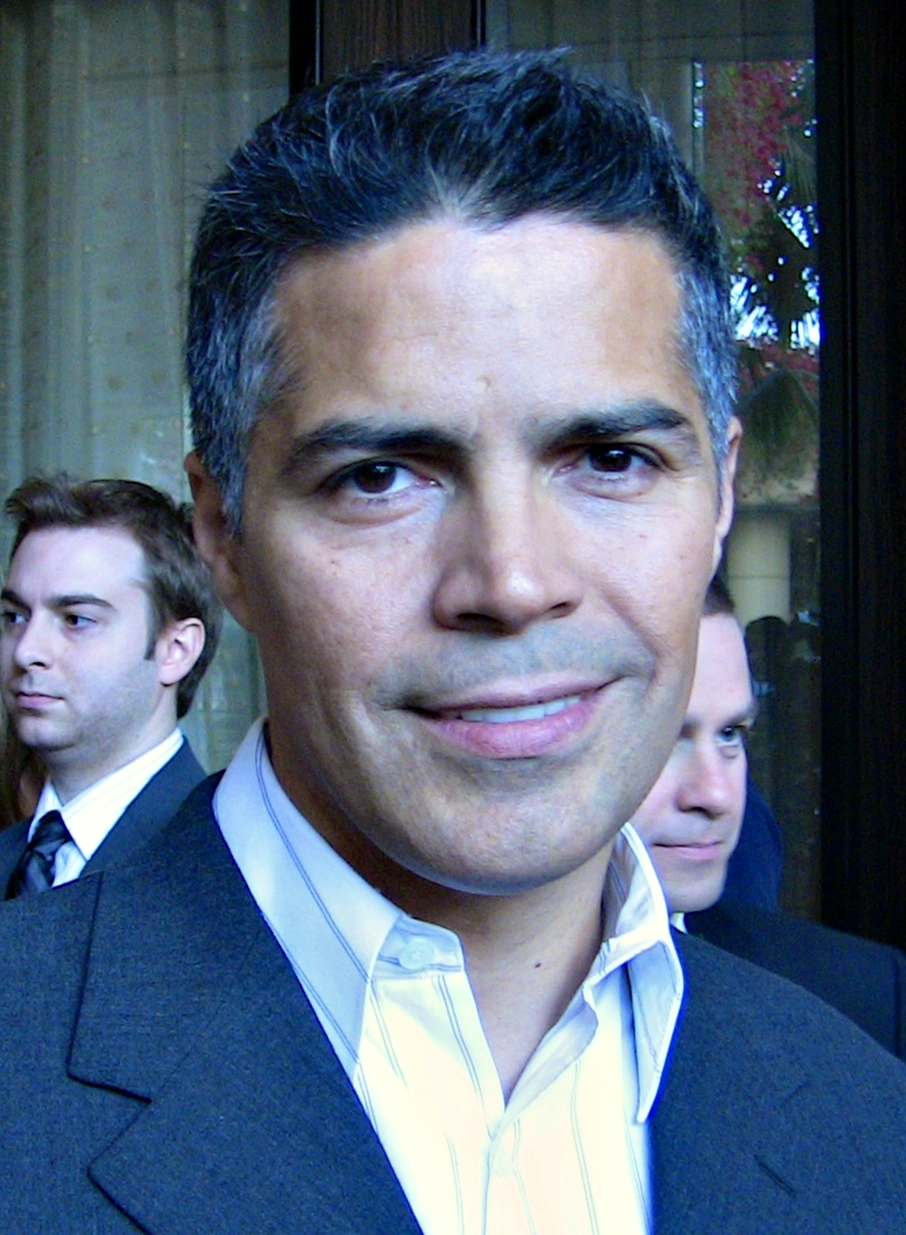
Esai Morales called Slade's conflict with the Titans "personal".

Portrayed by Esai Morales.

Deathstroke, real name Slade Wilson, is a biologically enhanced assassin and former Delta Force operator. He received his abilities from participating in a H.I.V.E. experiment and was the experiment's only surviving subject. Deathstroke was involved in a past conflict with the original Titans caused by him inadvertently killing their teammate Garth, which prompted Dick to use Deathstroke's son Jericho against him. When a fight between Deathstroke and Dick ended with Jericho jumping in front of his father's blade to save Dick, the two agreed to keep the circumstances of Jericho's death a secret. Initially unbeknownst to Dick, however, Jericho survived by entering his father's body and Deathstroke has kept him trapped inside over the following four years.

In the second season, Deathstroke comes out of retirement when he learns that the Titans have returned. Aided by his daughter, Rose Wilson, Deathstroke forces Dick to confess the circumstances behind Jericho's death, which causes Dick's team to abandon him. This leads Deathstroke to declare victory over Dick, but warns him that he will kill the Titans if they reunite; a promise he takes action on after Donna Troy, Dawn Granger, Kory Anders, and Rachel Roth team up to save Gar Logan and Conner from Lex Luthor's Cadmus Laboratories. Dick, learning the truth about Jericho, prevents Deathstroke from killing his teammates under his new Nightwing identity. Deathstroke's defeat occurs when Rose turns against him, killing her father while Jericho escapes into her body.

In the fourth season, Mother Mayhem sends a zombie version of Deathstroke to obtain Sebastian Sanger. While it manages to wound Superboy, the Zombie Deathstroke was fooled by Jinx posing as Sebastian as she stabs it in the other eye and makes off with its gun.

=== Rose Wilson ===
Portrayed by Chelsea Zhang.

Rose Wilson is the daughter of Deathstroke, sharing his enhanced reflexes and regenerative healing. Born from her father's extramarital affair, she grew up unaware of his identity, but recognized that he played a role in her superhuman abilities. After seeking him out, Rose was recruited by Deathstroke to act as his mole against the Titans.

In the second season, Rose successfully infiltrates the team by claiming she wants her father dead to avenge her half-brother Jericho's demise. She also succeeds in creating tension among the Titans, which leads to them disbanding after Dick Grayson is forced to admit the true circumstances of how Jericho died. Rose's mission, however, becomes compromised when she develops romantic feelings for Jason Todd, who leaves her when she confesses her true role to him. This prompts Rose to turn against Deathstroke, killing him while Jericho escapes from their father's body into hers. Afterwards, she joins the new Titans team.

=== Subject 13 / Conner Kent / Superboy ===
Portrayed by Joshua Orpin and Brooker Muir (body double).

Conner Kent, officially known as Subject 13, is a genetic clone of Superman and Lex Luthor created by Luthor's Cadmus Laboratories. He is Cadmus' 13th test subject and the first successful Superman clone. He adopts the name "Conner" from the nametag of a uniform he takes while escaping from the laboratory. Because of his human/Kryptonian hybrid physiology, Conner possesses both Lex's genius level intellect in sciences and technology, and Superman's superpowers like electromagnetic spectrum vision, heat vision, super strength, speed, stamina, breath and invulnerability. Like Superman, he is also vulnerable to kryptonite and magic.

In the first season, Conner escapes from Cadmus Laboratories while also freeing Krypto, a dog with Kryptonian abilities.

In the second season, Conner encounters the Titans when he saves Jason Todd from Deathstroke. Hunted by Cadmus personnel, Conner voluntarily surrenders to them when their leader, Mercy Graves, promises to help him control his hosts' impulses. He is subsequently brainwashed by Cadmus, who turn him into a biological weapon forced to obey the orders of his controller. Mercy attempts to auction him off to bidders, but Dick Grayson and Rachel Roth manage to free Conner from the mind control as the Titans defeat Cadmus.

In the third season, Conner starts to take up the name of Superboy. He accompanies the Titans to Gotham City to investigate Jason's death and surprise revival as Red Hood.

In the fourth season, Conner meets Lex who is dying and wants Conner to run LexCorp. When the Church of Blood kill Lex, Conner is blamed and arrested, but later exonerated. When dealing with the Church of Blood, Conner shaved his head and became the head of LexCorp. Following Brother Blood's defeat, Conner finally meets Superman and learns how to fly.

=== Barbara Gordon ===
Portrayed by Savannah Welch.

Barbara Gordon is the daughter of Commissioner James Gordon who operated as Batgirl. After being shot by Joker, Barbara was paralyzed from the waist down and has to move around in a wheelchair. For an unknown reason, she is missing a leg. After her father had a heart attack after being freed from a block of ice that Mr. Freeze put him in, Barbara becomes the new police commissioner of the Gotham City Police Department.

Dick visited Gotham City after hearing about Jason Todd's death where he and Barbara argued about the path that Bruce is going down. She does start to have some issues with the Titans when it comes to the attacks by Red Hood. After being arrested for attacking Fletcher for insubordination, Barbara breaks out of her cell and makes her way down to Oracle's chamber. Margarita Vee takes out the police officers with her and reveals her connection with A.R.G.U.S. which has gotten involved in the Gotham City crisis.

=== Jonathan Crane ===
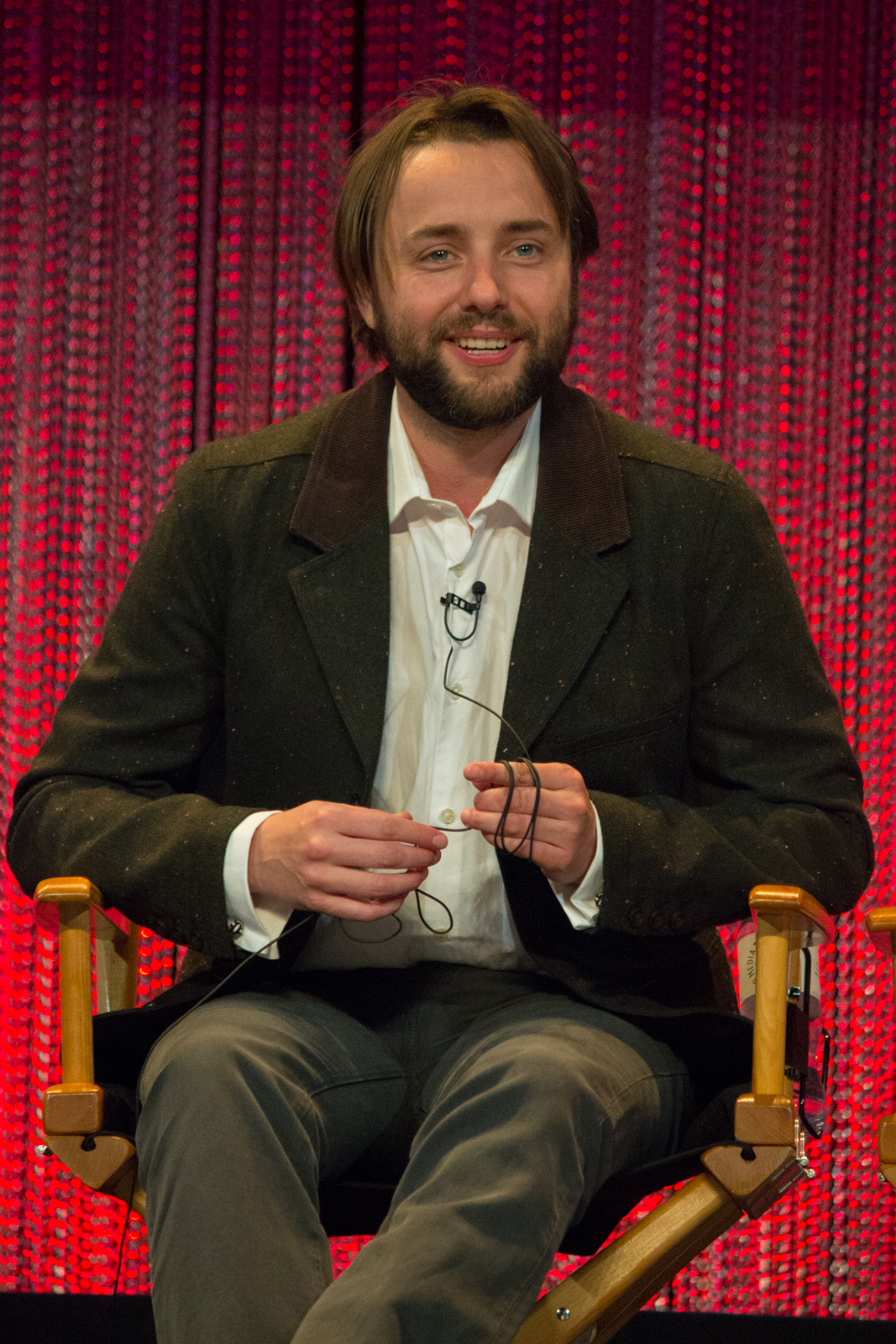
Series producers compared Vincent Kartheiser's Crane to Hannibal Lecter.

Portrayed by Vincent Kartheiser.

Dr. Jonathan Crane is criminal psychologist who operates in Gotham City. Under the identity of Scarecrow, he became one of Bruce Wayne's most prominent adversaries. He exploits his victims' fears through experimental toxins and psychological tactics.

In the third season, Crane has been apprehended and incarcerated at Arkham Asylum for an unspecified period. At the advice of Bruce, he has been utilized by the Gotham City Police Department as a consultant who helps profile and capture criminals. Dick Grayson reluctantly seeks advice from Crane in battling Red Hood, which helps him discover Red Hood's identity as Jason Todd, but Crane is revealed to have manipulated Jason into becoming Red Hood, which he attempts to cover up by staging an assassination attempt that will have him transferred to a new prison. Dick abducts Crane during the transfer to lure Jason into a confrontation, but Crane is freed by Jason as he works to spread his chemicals throughout Gotham City. Jason starts to regret his actions. When Tim follows Jason to where the Titans are supposed to meet him, Crane appeared and shot Tim. Then he tricked Starfire into attacking the chemical barrels so that they can be spread into the water supply. After framing them through the footage and the Titans get scattered throughout Gotham City, Crane moves into Wayne Manor and has Jason slash the Wayne Family portrait. After being defeated by Tim, Crane is returned to Arkham Asylum. Before leaving Gotham City, Dick has Rachel subject Crane to the Lazarus Pit's magic.

=== Tim Drake / Robin ===
Portrayed by Jay Lycurgo.

Timothy "Tim" Drake is a young Gotham City resident seeking to become a vigilante. Due to his strong investigative skills, he identifies Bruce Wayne as Batman and Dick Grayson as Nightwing. He attempts to assist the Titans in an effort to become the next Robin, which results in him being killed by Jonathan Crane, but upon escaping the afterlife with Donna Troy, Tim participates in the final battle against Crane and knocks him out during a confrontation. Afterwards, Tim joins the Titans during their return to San Francisco.

In season four, Tim gets a bo staff from S.T.A.R. Labs. He starts to develop a relationship with Bernard Fitzmartin. He officially becomes Robin and gets trained by Red Hood at the time he is sent to find a lead in Gotham City.

=== May Bennett / Mother Mayhem ===
Portrayed by Franka Potente.

Mother Mayhem is the leader of the Church of Blood and the biological mother of Sebastian Sanger through Trigon.

=== Sebastian Sanger / Brother Blood ===
Portrayed by Joseph Morgan.

Sebastian Sanger is a store owner who started to see visions of blood on different things and is the biological son of May Bennett. He would later surrender himself to Mother Mayhem and undergo the transformation into Brother Blood.

== Recurring characters ==
=== Introduced in season one ===
==== Dr. Adamson ====
Portrayed by Reed Birney.

Dr. Adamson is a high-ranking member of Trigon's organization, holding authority over the Nuclear Family and Agnews Asylum. After being captured by Dick Grayson, he slits his throat to force Rachel Roth to save him with her powers. He later escapes when Dick, Rachel, Kory Anders, and Gar Logan are captured at the asylum, but while attempting to force Rachel into summoning Trigon, Rachel kills him by restoring his fatal wound.

Season four revealed that he had a history with Mother Mayhem.

==== Nuclear Family ====
Portrayed by Jeff Clarke (Dad), Melody Johnson (Mom), Jeni Ross (Sis), Logan Thompson (Biff), and Zach Smadu (Stepdad).

The Nuclear Family are a group of individuals brainwashed into working for Trigon. They present themselves as a stereotypical nuclear family of two parents and their dependent children, but handle violent tasks for the organization and utilize drugs to enhance their physical attributes. While the Nuclear Family initially succeeds in capturing Rachel Roth, Kory Anders rescues her and kills Nuclear Dad in the process. Joined by Nuclear Stepdad as a replacement, Nuclear Mom, Nuclear Sis, and Nuclear Biff then ambush Rachel, Kory, Dick Grayson, and Gar Logan, but are defeated and captured. When Dr. Adamson learns of their defeat, he kills them through activating bombs implanted in their heads.

==== Angela Azarath ====
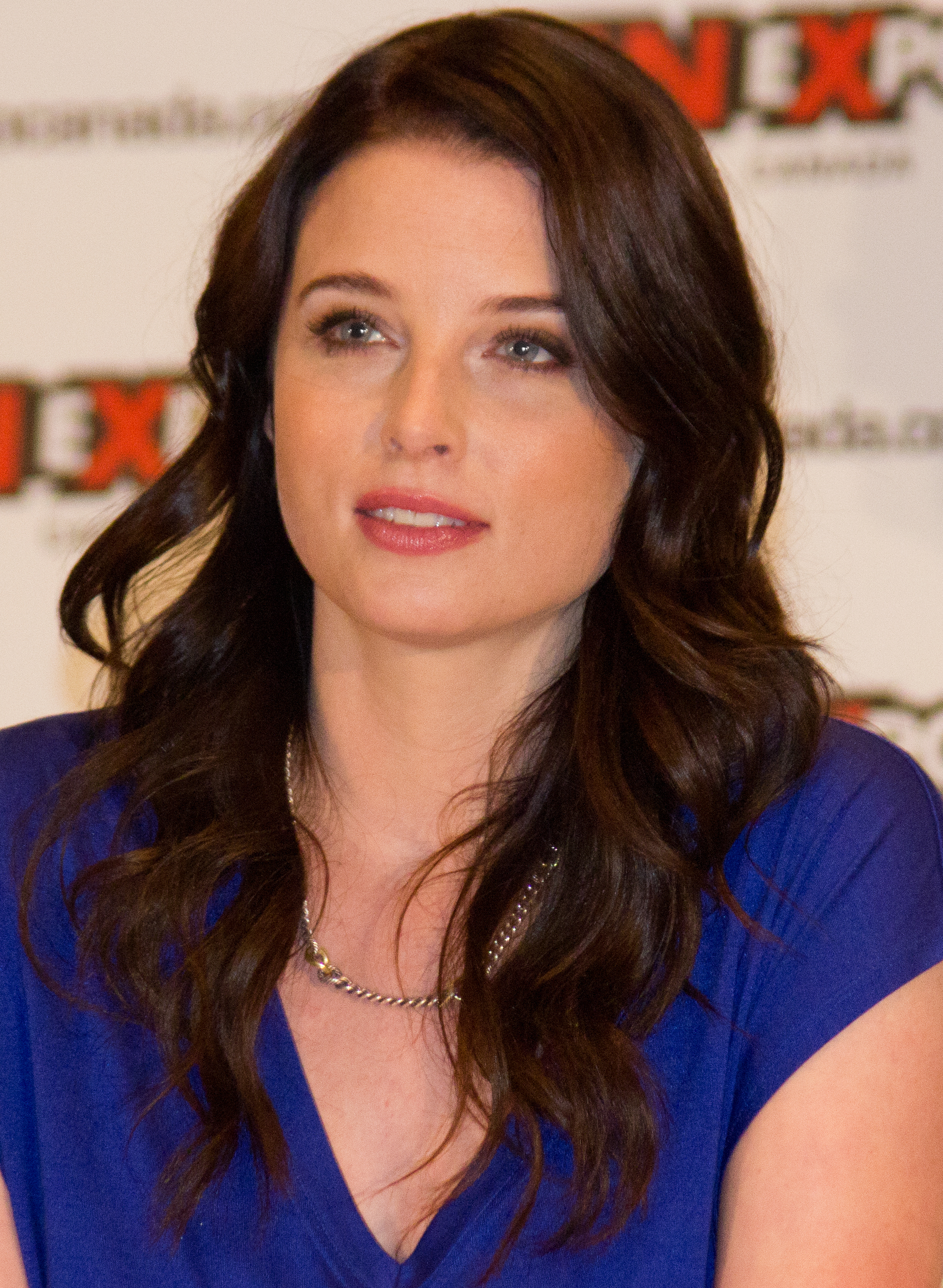
Unlike the comics, Rachel Nichols played a villainous Angela.

Portrayed by Rachel Nichols.

Angela Azarath is Rachel Roth's biological mother. At the start of the series, she has been held captive at Agnews Asylum for an undisclosed period, with Rachel unaware of her existence. Rachel, Dick Grayson, Kory Anders, and Gar Logan succeed in freeing her, but Angela is subsequently revealed to be in league with Trigon. By poisoning Gar, Angela forces Rachel to summon her father in order to save Gar's life. Trigon then kills Angela, having no more use for her.

==== Trigon ====
Portrayed by Seamus Dever (season 1-2) and Craig Burnatowski (season 4).

Trigon, the father of Rachel Roth, is an interdimensional demon with the power to destroy worlds. He can also take control of individuals by manipulating the dark thoughts inside of them. His arrival on Earth is dependent on Rachel summoning him, while obtaining his full powers requires Rachel's spirit to be broken. Both of these prove successful, but Rachel is able to escape from his control and defeat him. Rachel assumes that he has been destroyed, although his ultimate fate is left ambiguous.

In season four, Trigon's cult is still active as Mother Mayhem speaks to him. It is also revealed that he fathered Sebastian Sanger through her.

==== Krypto ====
Portrayed by Wrigley, Digby and Lacey (season 2), Pepsi and Ziva (season 3).

Krypto is a dog possessing Kryptonian powers. He resembles a Golden Retriever, although it is not established whether he is an alien breed from Krypton or the result of an experiment. Held captive in a kryptonite cage at Cadmus Laboratories, he is freed by Conner and becomes his companion, including after Conner joins the Titans.

=== Introduced in season two ===
==== Bruce Wayne ====
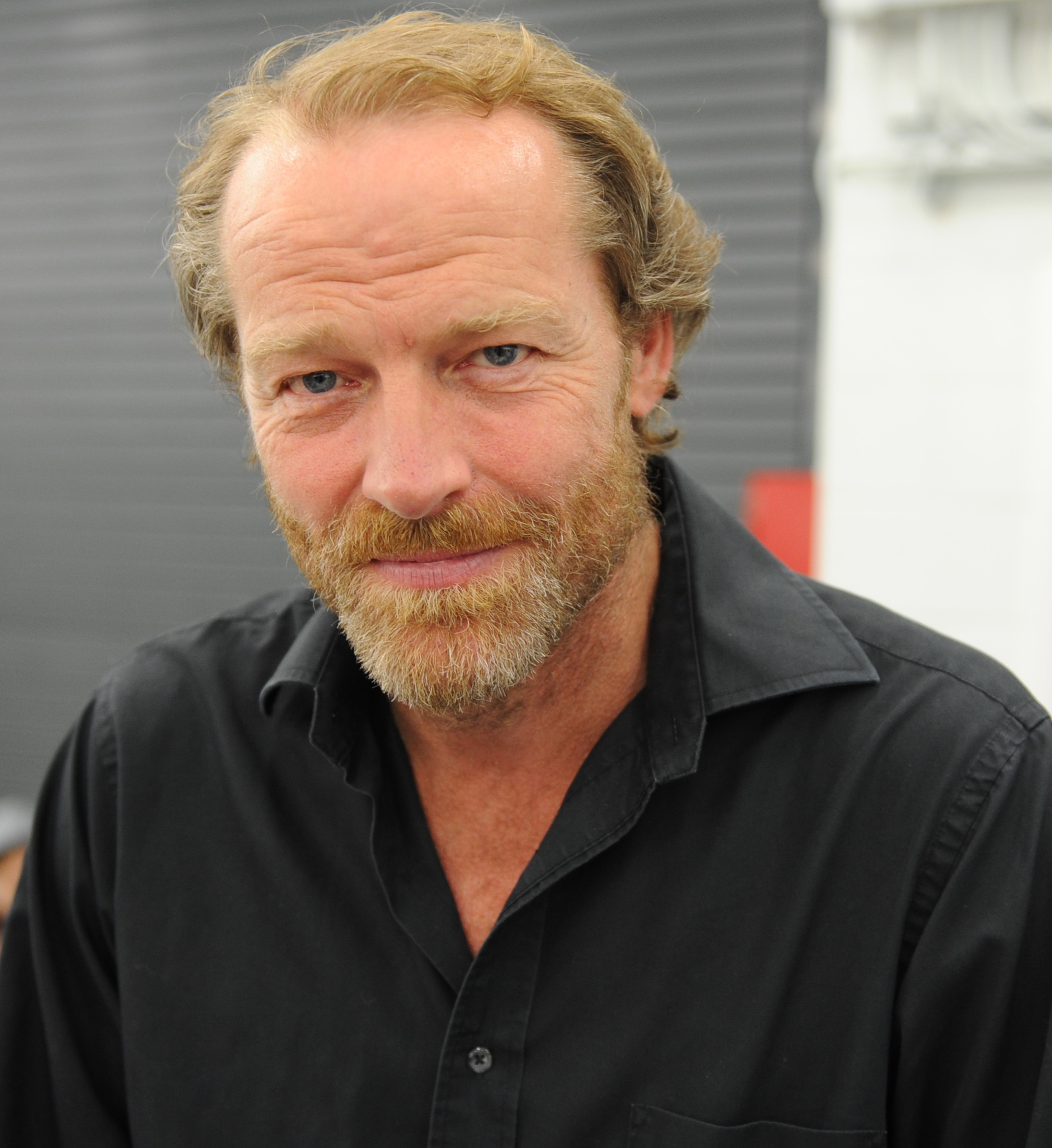
Iain Glen was billed as a special guest star on Titans.

Portrayed by Iain Glen, Alain Moussi and Maxime Savaria (stunt doubles).

Bruce Wayne is a billionaire in Gotham City who secretly moonlights as the feared vigilante Batman. He is responsible for adopting Dick Grayson after the death of his parents and training him into the role of Robin. The two begin the series on estranged terms, but make amends during the second season, and Bruce maintains his mentorship role to Dick. Conversely, he also appears as a manifestation of Dick's guilty conscience, although this imaginary version of Bruce helps Dick deduce that Jericho is still alive. Another illusion of Bruce appears at the Elko Diner in an effort to unite Kory Anders, Rachel Roth, Donna Troy, and Dawn Granger; it is implied that he was created through Rachel's powers.

In season three, Bruce leaves Gotham in Dick's protection after Jason Todd's death causes him to murder the Joker. He later attempts suicide by castle fire, but is rescued by Donna. Following Jonathan Crane's defeat, Bruce returns to Gotham where he makes amends with Jason and thanks Dick for keeping Gotham City safe in his absence.

In season four, Dick gets a call from Bruce where he has hooked them up with S.T.A.R. Labs and arranged for Superman to meet Superboy. What he didn't know was that Superman had to be called away to deal with a collapsing dwarf star in another galaxy.

==== William Wintergreen ====
Portrayed by Demore Barnes.

William Wintergreen is Deathstroke's handler and loyal ally. He met Deathstroke while they served in Delta Force together and remained in contact after Deathstroke became an assassin. Wintergreen is responsible for providing Deathstroke with his assignments, as well as maintaining his arsenal and equipment.

==== Dr. Arthur Light ====
Portrayed by Michael Mosley.

Dr. Arthur Light is a former physicist who turned criminal after an accident caused him to develop the ability to control light. Defeated by the original Titans team, he spends four years in prison until he is freed by Deathstroke to help eliminate the new Titans, but Dr. Light refuses to follow Deathstroke's orders, which results in Deathstroke killing him.

==== Jericho ====
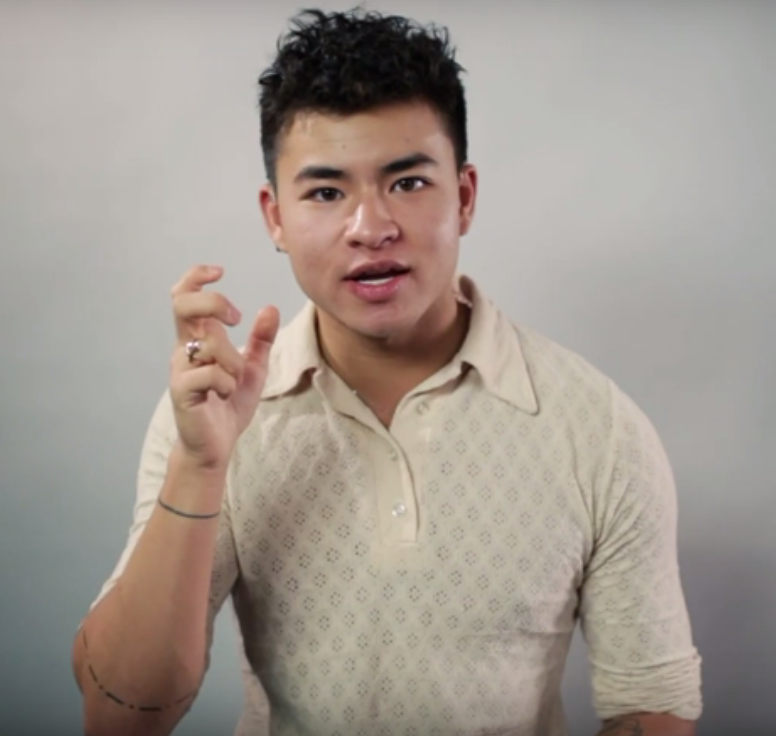
Deaf actor Chella Man found it important for disabled actors to play disabled characters.

Portrayed by Chella Man.

Jericho is Deathstroke's son and Rose Wilson's half-brother who, as a result of sharing his father's biologically enhanced DNA, holds the ability to possess others through eye contact. He was rendered mute when a group of assailants pursuing Deathstroke slit his vocal chords, although he regains his ability to speak when inside of others' bodies. Due to the admiration he held for his father, Jericho was kept unaware of Deathstroke's assassin profession by Adeline. When the Titans sought revenge against Deathstroke for killing Garth, they initially manipulated Jericho to obtain information on his father, but eventually told him the truth about themselves and his father's occupation. This revelation turned Jericho against his father, prompting Deathstroke to arrange a private meeting between them, which Dick Grayson intruded on. Jericho ultimately sacrificed himself to save Dick by jumping in front of his father's blade, but unknown to Dick, he survived by transferring his consciousness into Deathstroke. Jericho spends the next four years trapped in Deathstroke's body until he escapes into Rose's body as she kills their father.

==== Walter Hawn ====
Portrayed by Raoul Bhaneja.

Walter Hawn is the vice-president of special projects at Cadmus Laboratories. Despite his high position, his authority is repeatedly circumvented by Mercy Graves when she arrives at Cadmus. Mercy eventually has him killed by the brainwashed Conner.

==== Mercy Graves ====
Portrayed by Natalie Gumede.

Mercy Graves is Lex Luthor's personal security specialist. On Luthor's orders, she takes over Cadmus Laboratories and leads the mission to recapture Conner. She initially succeeds in brainwashing Conner into becoming a biological weapon for bidders, but her plans fail when the Titans rescue Conner and she is knocked unconscious by Kory while attempting to escape.

==== Adeline ====
Portrayed by Mayko Nguyen.

Adeline is Jericho's mother and Deathstroke's former wife. She is aware of Jericho's survival, but keeps this information secret, presumably under threat from Deathstroke. When Dick Grayson learns the truth about Jericho still being alive in Deathstroke, Adeline asks him to save her son.

==== Justin Cole ====
Portrayed by McKinley Freeman.

Justin Cole is a psychiatrist who encounters Kory in Las Vegas. The two have a brief sexual encounter until Kory is distracted by a message for the Elko Diner. In season three, Justin contacts Kory after learning of her identity as Starfire. He attempts to help Kory with her hallucinations, but Kory ultimately rebuffs him.

=== Introduced in season three ===
==== Drake family ====
Portrayed by Ryan Allen (Jack Drake), Chantria Tram (Janet Drake), and Vinson Tran (Stephen Chen).

Tim Drake's family, comprising his father Jack, mother Janet, and maternal cousin Stephen Chen. Jack, a former police officer, and Janet own a takeout restaurant in Gotham City, which Stephen works at. During a wave of violence caused by Jason Todd distributing Jonathan Crane's drug to street criminals, Jack is shot, but ultimately survives. The three later escape Gotham City with the help of Tim and Donna Troy, with Jack allowing Tim to stay behind to save Gotham from Crane.

==== Margarita Vee ====
Portrayed by Karen Robinson.

Margarita Vee is an A.R.G.U.S. agent posing as a high-ranking member of the Gotham City Police Department. Assigned by Roy Harper to monitor supernatural activity, she reveals her true identity to Barbara Gordon after rescuing her from corrupt police officers. Following Jonathan Crane's defeat, Vee attempts to recruit Donna Troy into A.R.G.U.S.

==== Molly Jensen ====
Portrayed by Eve Harlow.

Molly Jensen is a friend of Jason Todd. She assists Jason in vigilante activities, including locating missing orphan children. After Jason becomes Red Hood, Molly breaks off contact with him due to his personality change. Molly later helps the Titans in their search for Jason.

=== Introduced in season four ===
==== Bernard Fitzmartin ====
Portrayed by James Scully.

Bernard Fitzmartin is a scientist at the Metropolis branch of S.T.A.R. Labs who is its Director of Special Projects. He provides Garfield with a special super-suit and gives Tim Drake a bō staff. A romantic relationship later develops between Bernard and Tim. He is adapted from the comics character Bernard Dowd, who was one of Tim's friends before they were both later depicted as bisexual.

==== Jinx ====
Portrayed by Lisa Ambalavanar.

Jinx is a magic-using thief and grifter who is one of Dick's old contacts. She helps the Titans deal with the Organization. During an attempt to rescue Sebastian, Jinx is stabbed by May Bennett as she quotes "Not again"! Raven later released her soul from the Church of the Blood's cave. Beast Boy later encountered her when being educated by Freedom Beast as she mentioned to have died before.

==== Confessor ====
Portrayed by Noah Dalton Danby.

The Confessor is a member of the Church of Blood. To prove to Sebastian that Mother Mayhem is using him, Connor abducted the Confessor and tortured him. He states that Sebastian will disappear when Trigon arrives. Sebastian later kills the Confessor by drinking his enchanted blood.

== Guest characters ==
The following is a supplementary list of guest stars who appear in lesser roles. The characters are listed in the order in which they first appeared.

=== Introduced in season one ===
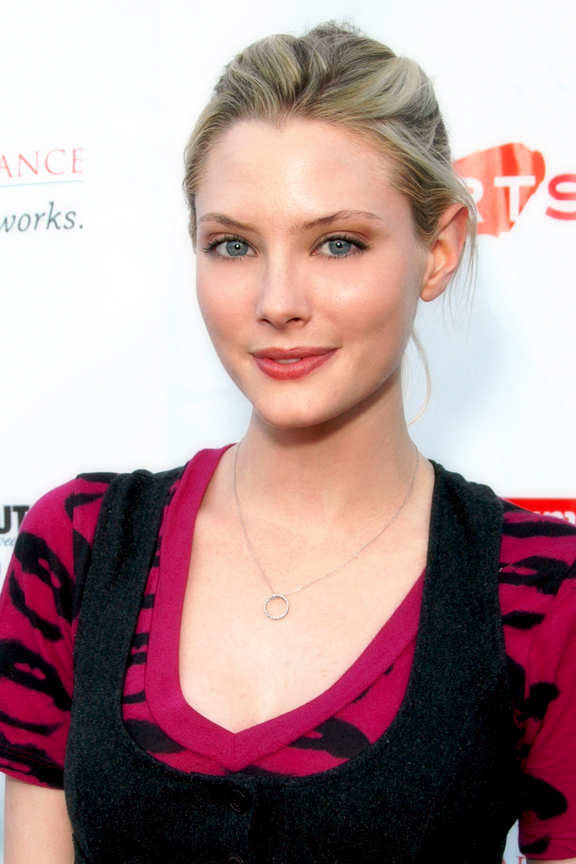
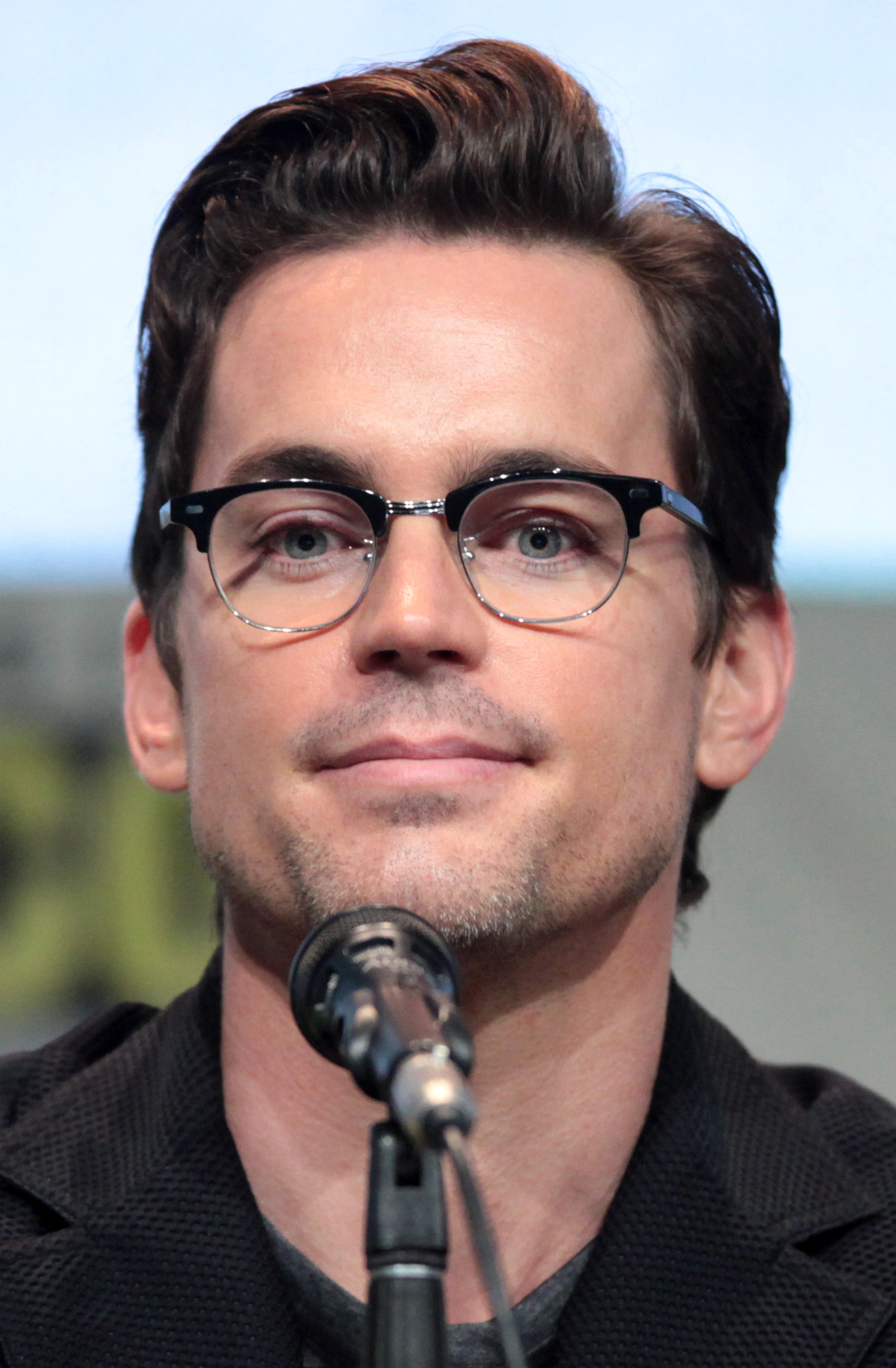
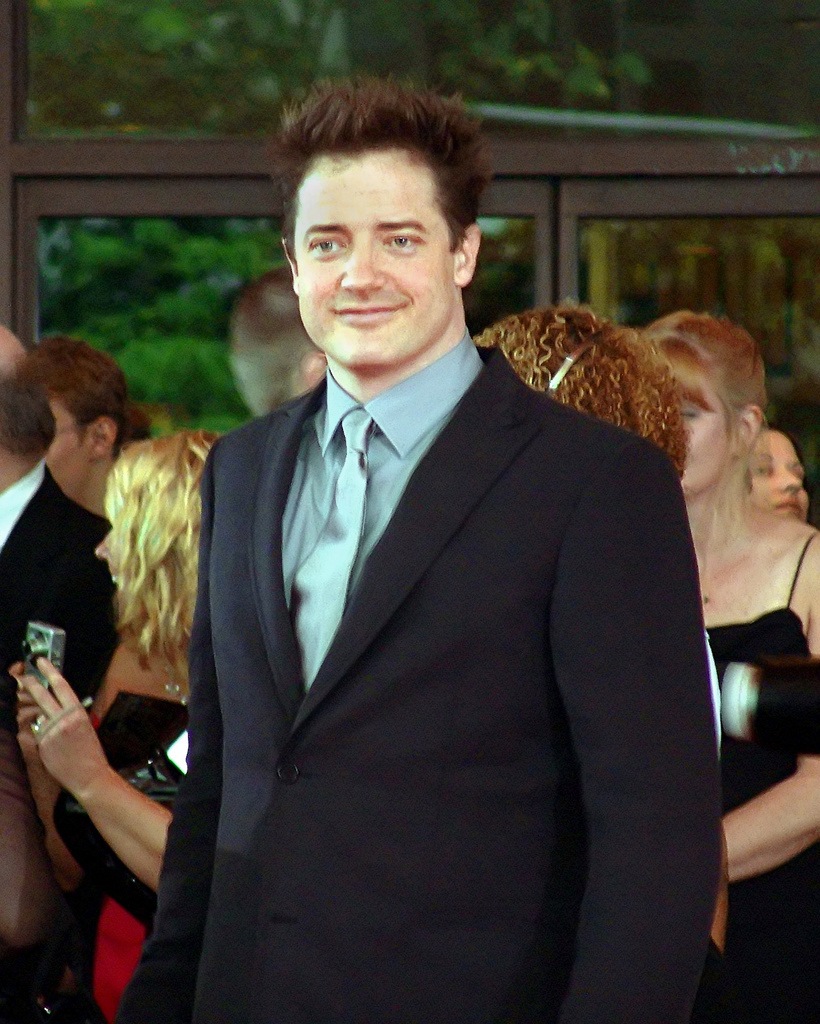
April Bowlby, Matt Bomer, and Brendan Fraser (top to bottom) reprised their roles on Doom Patrol.
- Amy Rohrbach (portrayed by Lindsey Gort) - a detective in the Detroit Police Department partnered with Dick, she is tortured and killed by the Nuclear Family in order to find Dick's whereabouts.
- The Acolyte (portrayed by Jarreth Merz) - a mysterious man hunting Rachel, he succeeds in capturing her, but is killed by her powers before he can end her life.
- Jessica Perez (portrayed by Liza Colón-Zayas) - a detective and Dick's superior in the Detroit Police Department.
- Melissa Roth (portrayed by Sherilyn Fenn) - Rachel's adoptive mother who raised Rachel to believe that she was her biological mother. After being forced to admit the truth to Rachel, she is killed by the Acolyte.
- Flying Graysons - John Grayson (portrayed by Randolf Hobbs in season 1, Sean Clement in season 3) and Mary Grayson (voiced by April Brown Chodkowski) are a pair of trapeze artists at Haly's Circus and Dick's parents. Both were killed when their performance was sabotaged by Tony Zucco, beginning Dick's journey into becoming a vigilante.
- Konstantin Kovar (portrayed by Mark Antony Krupa) - a gangster in Vienna, Austria whose organization was infiltrated by Kory as part of her mission to find Rachel. Due to Kory's deception, he attempts to have her killed, but this results in him being incinerated by her powers.
- Sister Catherine (portrayed by Meagen Fay) - the head of a convent that Rachel resided in as a child, responsible for taking her in and managing her adoption to Melissa. When Rachel returns to the convent, she attempts to imprison her, but Rachel escapes through her powers.
- Becky Bond (portrayed by Cara Ricketts) - a social worker who managed Bruce's adoption of Dick.
- Rita Farr (portrayed by April Bowlby) - a member of the Doom Patrol and former actress who has difficulty maintaining a solid form after being exposed to a toxic gas.
- Niles Caulder / Chief (portrayed by Bruno Bichir) - a medical scientist and the leader of the Doom Patrol, responsible for saving the lives of its members and giving them residence in his mansion. After regaining the ability to walk, he attempts to experiment on Rachel. This causes him to have his spine broken by her powers and become immobilized again.
- Shyleen Lao (portrayed by Hina Adbullah) - a young woman saved by the Chief after she is covered in liquid nitrogen. As a result of the Chief's experiment, she develops the ability to control temperature.
- Cliff Steele (performed by Jake Michaels in season one, Riley Shanahan in season four, voiced by Brendan Fraser) - a member of the Doom Patrol and former car racer whose brain was transplanted into a robotic body after an accident destroyed his own.
- Larry Trainor / Negative Man (performed by Dwain Murphy in season one, Matthew Zuk in season four, voiced by Matt Bomer) - a member of the Doom Patrol and former pilot wrapped entirely in bandages after being exposed to negative energy.
- Asylum Doctor (portrayed by Rachael Crawford) - the unnamed head of Agnews Asylum, working for Trigon's organization and under Dr. Adamson. She is implied to be killed when Kory destroys the asylum, although her ultimate fate is left unknown.
- Clayton Williams (portrayed by Lester Speight) - a nightclub security guard who was previously a strongman at Haly's Circus and Dick's caretaker before Bruce adopted Dick. He is the last member of Haly's Circus to be targeted by Nick Zucco, but Dick and Jason manage to save him.
- Tony Zucco (portrayed by Richard Zeppieri) - a high-ranking gangster in the Maroni crime family responsible for the deaths of Dick's parents. After being arrested, he agrees to testify against the Maronis in exchange for a release from prison which prompts Dick to make an attempt on his life. While Dick is unable to kill him, Zucco is subsequently assassinated by the Maronis after being refused help from Dick.
- Nick Zucco (portrayed by Kyle Mac) - Tony Zucco's son and only surviving relative with the rest of his family murdered by the Maronis. Disfigured from the Maronis' acid, he plots revenge against Dick by murdering the members of his circus troupe with the same acid, but is defeated by Dick and Jason.
- Graham Norris (portrayed by Damian Walshe-Howling) - an international poacher and contact of Donna, who uses him to shut down other poachers. When Dick inadvertently sabotages their meeting, Donna is forced to knock Norris unconscious and make it appear that Dick also attacked her.
- Don Hall / Dove (portrayed by Elliot Knight and Jayden Marine as a child) - the original vigilante partner and younger half-brother of Hank Hall. Although focused more on his academic studies, he was able to fight crime with Hank by training as a martial artist. He helps Hank take down several child predators until he is killed in the street accident that also takes the life of Marie Granger. In season three, Don reunites with Hank in the afterlife as they work to protect the wandering souls from the ghouls.
- Marie Granger (portrayed by Marina Sirtis) - Dawn's mother. She was involved in an abusive relationship with Dawn's father despite Dawn's efforts to keep Marie away from him. Marie would be killed in the street accident that also took the life of Don Hall.
- Vincent (portrayed by Trevor Hayes) - a child molester who was Hank's football coach. Despite the trauma he inflicted on Hank, Hank resists going after him until Dawn confronts him at his house. Vincent manages to subdue Dawn, but is overpowered and beaten to death by Hank.
- Thomas Carson (portrayed by Jeff Roop) - the sheriff in Angela Azarath's hometown of Killdeer, Ohio and former high school classmate of hers. After inadvertently stumbling into the ritual intended to summon Trigon, he is killed by Angela.
- Johnny Grayson (portrayed by James Scallion) - the illusionary son of Dick and Dawn, he appears in the fantasy that Trigon creates for Dick.

=== Introduced in season two ===
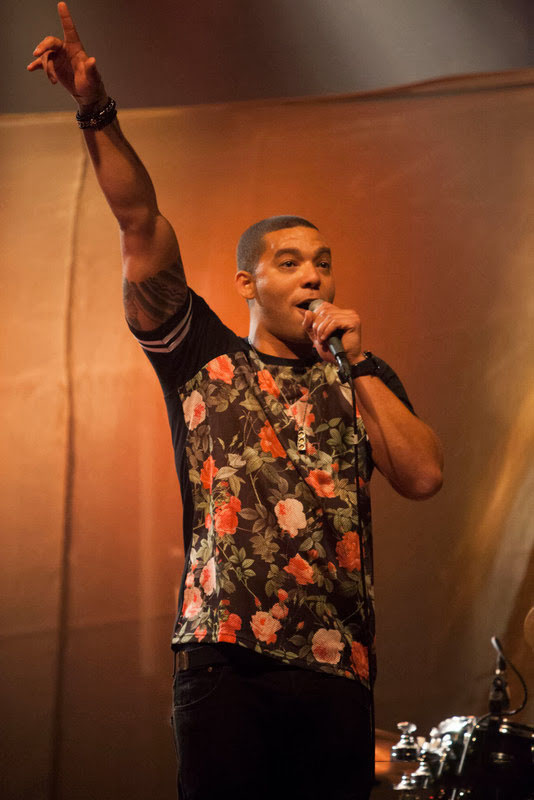
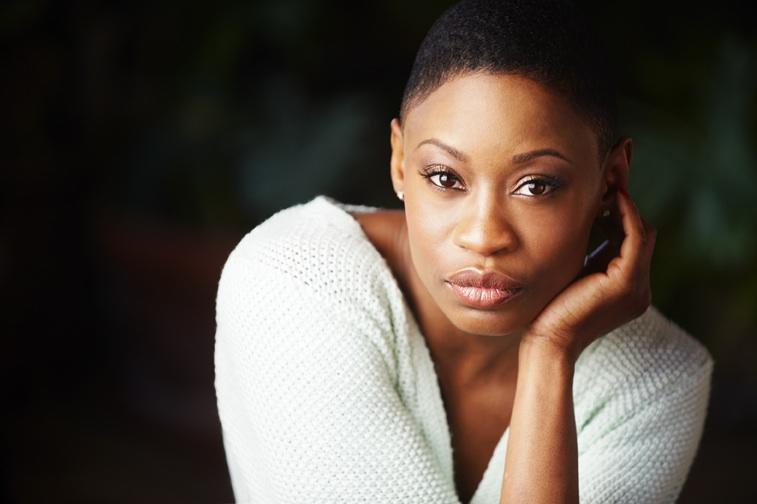
Ishan Morris (top) previously played the abusive boyfriend of Oluniké Adeliyi's character in Saw 3D.
- Faddei (portrayed by Robbie Jones) - a royal guard from Tamaran and former romantic interest of Kory. He is initially sent to Earth on orders from Blackfire to bring Kory back to their home planet, but after Blackfire claims Tamaran's throne, he and Kory become targeted by her. Blackfire eventually manages to take over his body, forcing Kory to kill him.
- Ellis (portrayed by Spencer Macpherson) - a recovering drug addict hired by Hank and Dawn to help manage their farm as a farmhand. He is killed when Dr. Arthur Light forces him to swallow a bomb as a message to them.
- Selinda Flinders / Shimmer (portrayed by Hanneke Talbot) - a metahuman criminal with the ability to alter compounds and elements. Kory and Donna successfully subdue her, leading to her arrest.
- Garth / Aqualad (portrayed by Drew Van Acker) - a member of the original Titans from Atlantis and former sidekick of Aquaman who possesses hydrokinetic and enhanced physical abilities. Although a new member, he was a lifelong friend of Donna and harbored mutual romantic feelings for her. He is inadvertently killed by Deathstroke when he sacrifices himself to save Jillian.
- Jillian (portrayed by Ann Magnuson) - an Amazon monitoring Donna who is posing as the curator of a museum. Targeted by Deathstroke, she survives his first assassination attempt because of Garth's sacrifice, but is eventually murdered by him alongside her guards.
- Dr. Eve Watson (portrayed by Genevieve Angelson) - a research scientist at Cadmus Laboratories responsible for creating Conner, she decides to assist him in his escape, while also attempting to help him understand who he is.
- Lionel Luthor (portrayed by Peter MacNeill) - a retired scientist and Lex Luthor's father. When Conner's memories bring him to his farm, he learns about Lex from Lionel. They are attacked by Mercy Graves' men, but Conner manages to protect Lionel. Mercy later told Lex that Lionel is doing alright.
- Martha Kent (portrayed by Sarah Deakins) - Superman's adoptive mother, she only appears in Conner's visions.
- Benny (portrayed by Curtis Lum) - a contact of Dick who operates a diner in San Francisco.
- Mati Matisse (portrayed by Oluniké Adeliyi) - a burlesque dancer formerly in a relationship with Wintergreen. As her sister overdosed while with Wintergreen, she provides Dick with information on finding him.
- Peg (portrayed by Elizabeth Whitmere) - the sister of Hank and Dawn's farmhand, she confronts them over his death, which causes Hank to question the harm he and Dawn inadvertently inflict on others.
- Len Armstrong (portrayed by Evan Jones) - a prison guard at the Kane County Correctional Facility, he attempts to coerce Dick into helping prevent jailbreaks, but Dick refuses. His fate when Kory and Rachel attack the facility is unknown.
- Rafi (portrayed by Orel De La Mota) - a Kane County Correctional Facility inmate who illegally entered the United States after he fled Corto Maltese. Dick helps him and Luis escape before they can be deported back to their home country.
- Luis (portrayed by Julian Works) - an illegal immigrant from Corto Maltese detained in Kane County Correctional Facility with Rafi and Santos. Awaiting deportation back to his home country, he and Rafi manage to escape with the help of Dick.
- Santos (portrayed by Rey Gallegos) - Rafi and Luis's cellmate at Kane County Correctional Facility and fellow Corto Maltese illegal immigrant. He plots an escape plan for his cellmates, but is killed by another inmate before he can implement it.
- Dani (portrayed by Sydney Kuhne) - a runaway fleeing from her abusive father Caleb, she befriends Rachel at a shelter and brings her to her hideout after Rachel saves her from Caleb, although Rachel leaves when she sees a message for the Elko Diner.
- Caleb (portrayed by Ishan Morris) - Dani's abusive father. When he attempts to force her back to their house, Rachel uses her powers to scare him away, but her powers also bring a stone gargoyle to life which kills him.
- Stuart (portrayed by Currie Graham) - the creator of Dick's costume and colleague of Bruce who is posing as a shoemaker. Although resentful over Dick burning his Robin costume, he provides Dick with the new Nightwing costume at Bruce's suggestion.
- Cage Announcer (portrayed by Patrick Garrow) - the unnamed announcer for Hank's cage fights.
- Faux Hawk (portrayed by Drew Scheid) - a teenager who poses as Hawk after buying the costume from a drug-induced Hank. Hank later takes the costume back without refunding him, although Faux Hawk admits that he was satisfied to have been able to wear it.
- Paris (portrayed by Natalie Morgan) - a pregnant woman who becomes Blackfire's host body on Earth after being possessed.

=== Introduced in season three ===
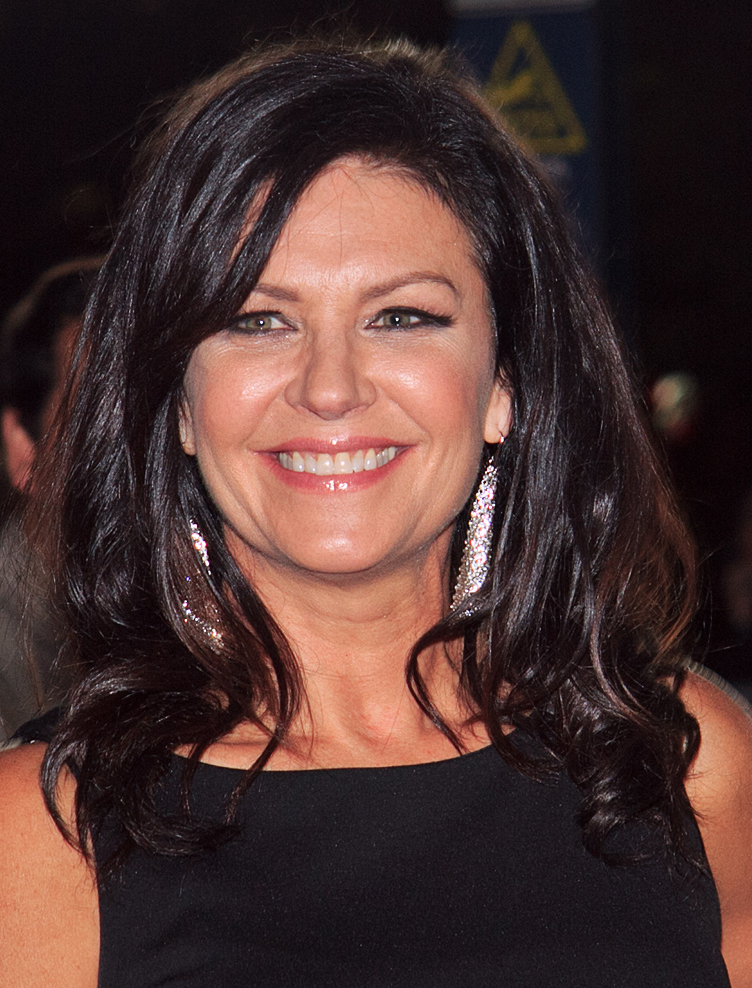
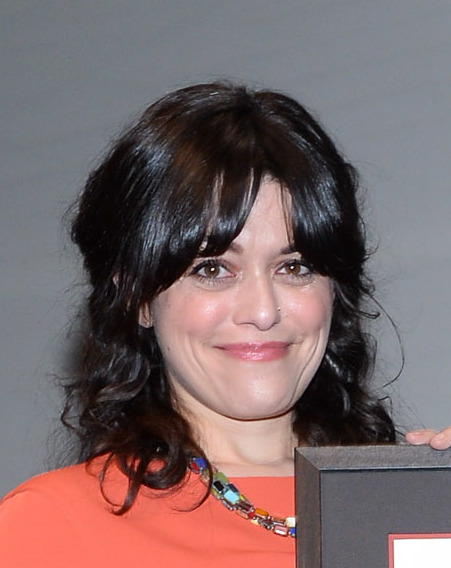
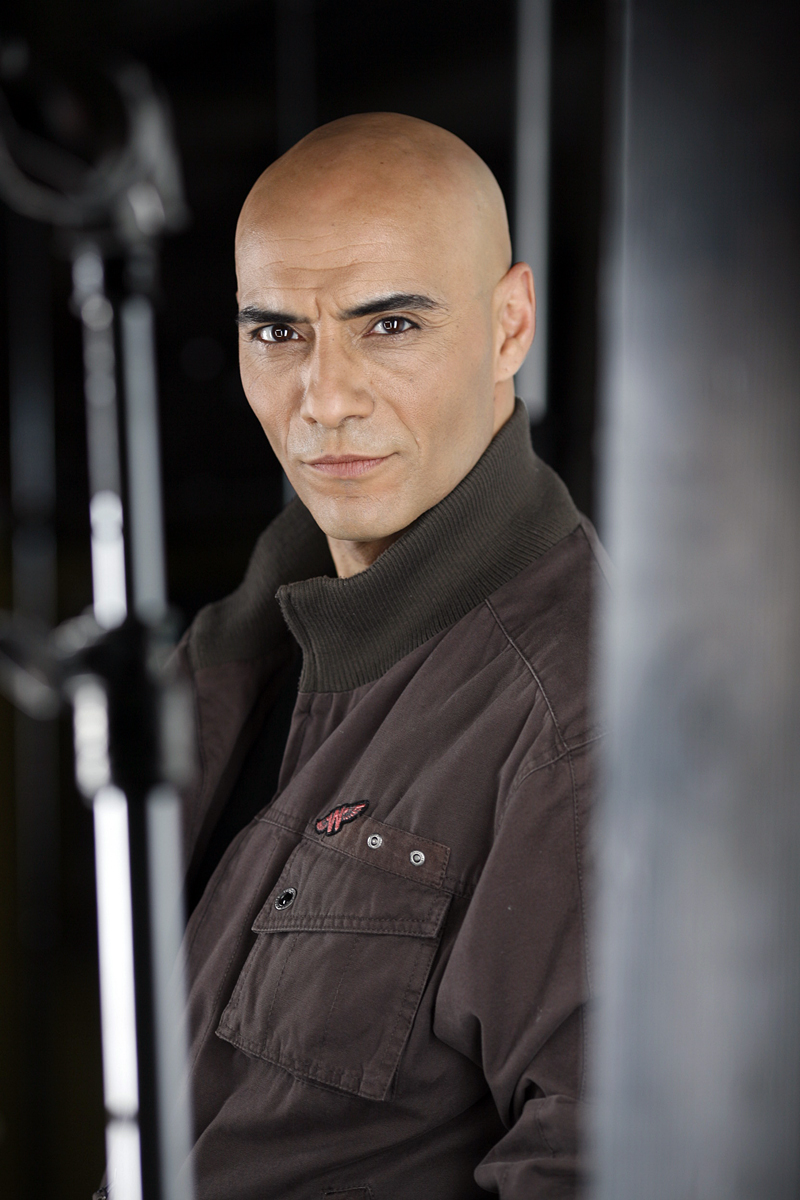
Wendy Crewson, Rose Napoli, and Anthony J. Mifsud (top to bottom) portray Gotham mobsters in season 3.
- Gizmo (portrayed by Dov Tiefenbach) - a technology-based criminal operating in San Francisco, he is defeated by the Titans while attempting to steal a virus at Dayton Labs.
- Valeska Nox (portrayed by Wendy Crewson) - one of Gotham City's mob bosses who takes advantage of Joker's death causing a power vacuum, Valeska secretly opposes Crane's plan to infest the city with his drug. She agrees to provide Kory and Blackfire with Crane's location if they reunite her with her son Michael. After Valeska shoots Michael for being an FBI informant, Kory responds by killing her causing Blackfire to get the location from one of Valeska's minions.
- Trina Holmes, Telly Rupp, Rafelson Roberts, and Santiago Perez (portrayed by Rose Napoli, Mal Dassin, Al McFoster and Anthony J. Mifsud) - mob bosses of Gotham City who take advantage of Joker's death causing a power vacuum. Rupp is killed by Jason after refusing to accept him as their enforcer. The remaining three support Crane's plan to distribute his drug throughout Gotham. When the Titans destroy the drug's distribution facility, they are forced to retreat.
- Tod (portrayed by Danny Smith) - a bicycle police officer partnered with Hank in Washington, D.C.
- Sanchez (portrayed by Paulino Nunez) - a Federal Bureau of Prisons operative responsible for Crane's transfer from Arkham Asylum. After Dick apprehends Crane before the transfer can take place, Sanchez tasks Barbara with tracking down Dick.
- Dr. Artie Kind (portrayed by Kris Siddiqi) - a government scientist in charge of an underground facility. He holds Blackfire in custody until Kory frees her. Kind later helps Blackfire return to Tamaran, ultimately rebuilding her ship with Conner's assistance.
- Leslie Thompkins (portrayed by Krista Bridges) - a therapist and friend of Bruce, she also worked with Crane until he exposed her to his fear toxin. At Bruce's request, she provides therapy sessions for Jason.
- Pete Hawkins (portrayed by Dylan Trowbridge) - a criminal responsible for abducting orphan children on the Joker's behalf, Jason kills him shortly after becoming Red Hood.
- Lady Vic (portrayed by Kimberly Sue-Murray) - an assassin skilled in martial arts and sword-based combat. Holding a vendetta against Dick and Barbara for their role in Bivens' death, she assists Crane in his plans. Although unable to assassinate Barbara, she obtains a photo of her that allows Crane to hack into Oracle.
- GCPD Administrator (portrayed by Raven Dauda) - an unnamed high-ranking member of the Gotham City Police Department.
- Bivens (portrayed by Maxime Savaria) - Lady Vic's partner and fellow assassin. During a fight against Dick and Barbara, he is accidentally killed by Lady Vic when Barbara tackles her causing a throwing knife intended for Dick to hit him instead.
- Oracle (voiced by Carlo Rota) - an artificial intelligence created by Bruce to provide surveillance throughout Gotham. Barbara reluctantly activates Oracle to locate Crane. After Crane hacks into the system, she permanently shuts it down. Following Crane's defeat, Barbara states that she intends to restore Oracle.
- Michael Nox (portrayed by Benjamin Liddell) - Valeska's son and an FBI informant. Kory and Blackfire are tricked into reuniting Michael with his mother which leads to Valeska killing him, but Kory avenges him by killing Valeska.
- Myrrha (portrayed by Tenika Davis) - an Amazon responsible for training Rachel on Themyscira.
- Lydia (portrayed by Valerie Buhagiar) - the leader of the Amazons training Rachel. After Donna returned from the dead, she also tests Donna's leadership abilities following her resurrection.
- Train Conductor (portrayed by Jasmin Geljo) - a mysterious entity who monitors deceased souls in the afterlife.
- Fletcher (portrayed by Greg Bryk) - a corrupt Gotham City detective working for Crane, he leads the officers under his command to carry out Crane's objectives, which includes attacking the Titans at the police headquarters, holding Barbara in custody, and guarding Wayne Manor while Crane uses it as his base. When the Titans raid Wayne Manor, he is knocked out by Dick.
- King Myand'r and Queen Luand'r (portrayed by Andrew Moodie and Asha James) - the rulers of Tamaran and Kory and Blackfire's parents. When Kory was born without their power to generate heat, they had Blackfire's powers transferred into her. During Kory's absence from Tamaran, they attempt to kill Blackfire who in turn kills them.

=== Introduced in season four ===
- Lex Luthor (portrayed by Titus Welliver as an adult, Page Novak as a child) - the CEO of LexCorp and archenemy of Superman whose DNA was used to create Conner. When Conner finally meets Lex Luthor, he is told by Lex that he is dying and wants him to take over LexCorp. Lex is then killed by the Church of Blood.
- Dr. Espensen (portrayed by Kyana Teresa) - a scientist who is the Director of Applied Science at S.T.A.R. Labs' Metropolis branch, she tested Kory's power output and helped Bernard fit a special super-suit on Garfield.
- Arthur Holmwood / Raven Mask (portrayed by Tim Post) - a member of the Church of Blood who wears a raven mask and poses as Lex Luthor's physician, he was responsible for killing women and abducting the males in their life to harvest blood before he was incinerated upon being defeated by Raven.
- Aria Murphy (portrayed by Emma Ho) - a young girl whose parents fall victim to the Church of Blood.
- Nicole Murphy (portrayed by Viena Hehir) - the mother of Aria who was killed by Raven Mask.
- Anthony Murphy (portrayed by Matt Wells) - the father of Aria who was among the males abducted by Raven Mask.
- Sandra Sanger (portrayed by Valerie Boyle as an old woman, Diane Chrisman as a young woman) - the foster mother of Sebastian who lives in a retirement home. When Sebastian later visits Sandra, he is told by May Bennett, disguised as a nurse, that she passed on.
- Gina (portrayed by Nicola Correia-Damude) - a member of the Church of Blood who knew May Bennett during her earlier days in the Church of Blood. Bennett later sacrificed her in order to further the Church of Blood's goals.
- Zadira (portrayed by Somkele Iyamah-Idhalama) - Kory's old trainer.
- Lironne (portrayed by Jonelle Gunderson) - a dark elf whose stolen heart turned Kory to stone. Dick had to return it to Lironne in order to get her to undo the spell.
- Lila (portrayed by Deneisha Henry as an adult, Ziyanda Moyo as a child) - a foster sister of Sebastian, she would later pop up as a member of the Church of Blood.
- Mr. Ross (portrayed by Daniel Brière) - Sebastian's high school teacher, he would later pop up as a member of the Church of Blood.
- Roberta (portrayed by Yanna McIntosh) - an associate of Dick who has translated different languages including alien language.
- Dave Carter (portrayed by Alan van Sprang) - the sheriff of Caul's Folly who is in league with Mother Mayhem.
- Megan (portrayed by Katie Matsell) - a deaf girl in Caul's Folly and an expert in lip-reading who is trapped there and works as a waitress.
- Jacob (portrayed by Joe Pingue) - a deaf man in Caul's Folly, an expert in lip-reading, and the father of Megan.
- Kris (portrayed by Keliah Griffiths) - a zookeeper who encounters a younger Gar.
- Dominic Mndawe / Freedom Beast (portrayed by Nyambi Nyambi) - a servant of the Red who serves as Beast Boy's guide. Besides his expert fighting skills, he has the ability to fuse animals into one Chimera.
- Dr. Myers (portrayed by Robert B. Kennedy) - a scientist and associate of Chief who was among those working on a disease that killed Gar's family, Freedom Beast's sister and her children, and some of the African animals in their possession. Freedom Beast fuses Myers and Djuba, ensuring that they will both die from the virus.
- Djuba - a gorilla who is a friend of Freedom Beast, it was infected with a virus that scientists led by Dr. Myers that were associated with Chief were using on the animals. Freedom Beast fuses Djuba and Myers, ensuring that they will both die from the virus.
- Courtney Whitmore / Stargirl (portrayed by Brec Bassinger) - a member of the Justice Society of America who Beast Boy encounters when he briefly ends up on Earth-2. Bassinger reprises her role from Stargirl.
- Grant Morrison (portrayed by themselves) - they are glimpsed by Beast Boy as he travels through the Red. Grant then notices Beast Boy and quotes "I see you. Do you see me?"
- Victor Stone / Cyborg (portrayed by Joivan Wade) - a cyborg superhero and member of the Doom Patrol who finds an unconscious Beast Boy in Doom Manor.
- Helena (portrayed by Allegra Fulton) - an old witch who Nightwing enlists with help from an unnamed British friend of his to find a way to sever Brother Blood's link with Rachel.

The following appear in archive recordings and archive footage that are seen in "Dude, Where's My Gar?":

- Grant Gustin as Barry Allen / Flash of Earth-Prime from The Flash.
- Derek Mears as Swamp Thing of Earth-19 from his self-titled TV series.
- Asher Angel as the voice of Billy Batson and Zachary Levi as Shazam from the DC Extended Universe.
- Greg Cipes as the voice of Beast Boy from Teen Titans Go!.
- Kaley Cuoco as the voice of Harley Quinn from her self-titled TV series.
- Jack Nicholson as the voice of Jack Napier / Joker from Batman (1989).
- Joaquin Phoenix as the voice of Arthur Fleck / Joker from Joker.
- Brent Stait as the voice of Kent Nelson / Doctor Fate from Smallville.
- Glenn Ford as the voice of Jonathan Kent from Superman.
- Cesar Romero as Joker from Batman (1966).
