= Jeong Jae-heon =

South Korean voice actor and actor (born 1975)

Jeong Jae-heon 정재헌
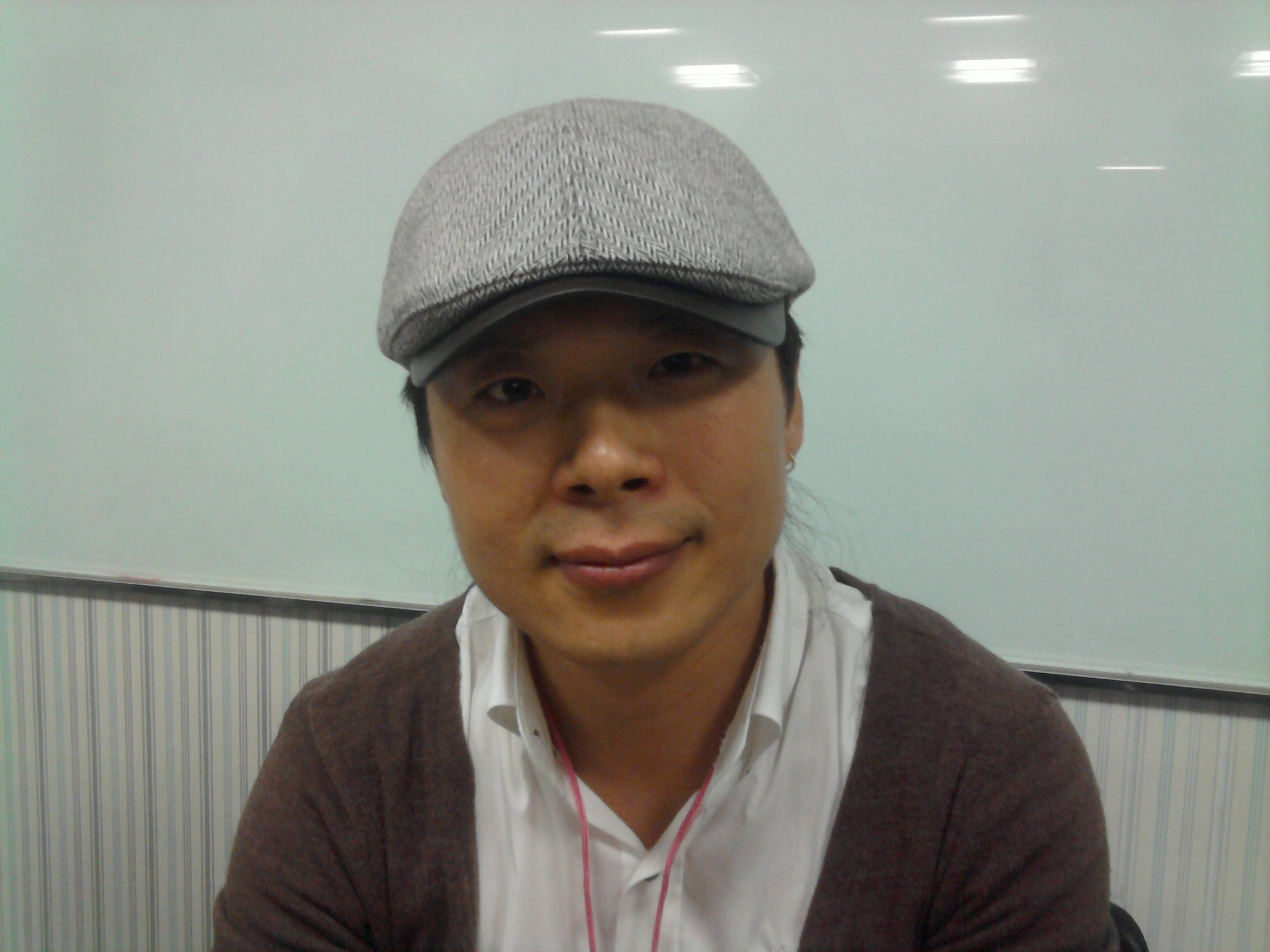
- Jeong in 2010
- Born: 정재헌; April 18, 1975 (age 51)
- Other names: Jeong-jae-ha-ya; Jeong-jelerator
- Education: Kyung Hee University (B.J. Journalism and Communication)
- Occupations: Voice actor; actor
- Years active: 2002–present
- Height: 168 cm (5 ft 6 in)

Korean name
- Hangul: 정재헌
- RR: Jeong Jaeheon
- MR: Chŏng Chaehŏn

Jeong Jae-heon (Korean: 정재헌; born April 18, 1975) is a South Korean voice actor and actor.

In 2002, Jeong joined Munhwa Broadcasting Corporation's Voice Acting Division. After being a freelancer, Jeong made a brief appearance on a 2005 South Korean film Quiz King, playing his role as a television news reporter. The voice actor became popular with his dub of Kiyomaro Takamine on Zatch Bell!, which has been one of his signature works. He gained popularity also by replacing Adam Rodriguez on CSI: Miami, and Archie Kao on CSI: Crime Scene Investigation. In late 2011, Jeong once was on stage, portraying Lee Mong-ryong in a South Korean charity play Hyang-dan, Fly.

== Filmography ==
=== Television animation ===
- 3000 Leagues in Search of Mother, Tonio Rossi
- Ace Attorney, Ryuichi Naruhodo / Phoenix Wright
- Alvinnn!!! and the Chipmunks, Simon Seville
- Air, Ryūya
- Animal Detective Kiruminzoo, Kanon's Grandfather
- Auto-B-Good, Derek, Johnny
- Bakugan Battle Brawlers, Hydron, Michael Gehabich
- Bakugan Battle Gear, Sid Arkale
- Beyblade: Metal Fusion, Tsubasa Otori
- Big Windup!, Kazutoshi Oki, Yoshirou Hamada
- Blazing Teens, Leon
- Bleach, Luppi Antenor
- Buddy Thunderstruck, Buddy Thunderstruck
- Cells at Work!, U-1146
- Chico Bon Bon: Monkey with a Tool Belt, Chico Bon Bon
- Cross Fight B-Daman, Basara Kurohuchi, Reiji Maki, Steer=Eagle
- Demon King from Today!, The Original King
- Detective Conan, Hakuba Saguru
- Eyeshield 21, Haruto Sakuraba
- Fairy Tail, Bora, Zeref
- From Me to You, Shota Kazehaya
- Genseishin Justirisers Demon Knight
- Genshiken, Kanji Sasahara
- Ghost Files, Kurama
- Giga Tribe, Tribe Green
- Gurren Lagann, Simon
- Haikyu!! (season 2), Tōru Oikawa
- Haruka: Beyond the Stream of Time, Eisen
- Hero Tales, Housei
- Hunter × Hunter, Hisoca
- Inazuma Eleven, Ichinose Kazuya, Nagumo Haruya, Shishido Sakichi
- Keshikasu-kun, Keshikasu-kun
- Kiba, Noa
- Littlest Pet Shop: A World of Our Own, Trip Hamston
- Looney Tunes Cartoons, Bugs Bunny
- Lovely Complex, Kazuki Kohori
- Lucky Star, Minoru Shiraishi
- Mōtto! Ojamajo Doremi, Ki-joon
- Naruto: Shippuden, Deidara
- Ninjago: Masters of Spinjitzu, Zane the White/Ice Ninja
- Octonauts, Kwazii
- One Piece, Trafalgar Law
- One-Punch Man, Speed-o'-Sound Sonic
- Oscar's Oasis, Roco
- The Penguins of Madagascar, Private
- Rapunzel's Tangled Adventure, Varian
- The Raspberry Times, Lime
- Revbahaf: The Story of Rebuilding the Kingdom, The Crown Prince of Viesenhar
- Robocar Poli, Dumpoo, Mr. Builder
- SD Gundam Force, Chief Haro
- SonicX, Shadow the Hedgehog
- Choi Jong-ni, Solo Leveling
- That's Amazing!! Mr. Masaru, Machahiko Kondō
- Uncle Grandpa, Pizza Steve
- Yes! Pretty Cure 5 GoGo!, Kanjine
- Violet Evergarden, Gilbert Bougainvillea
- Yu-Gi-Oh! Duel Monsters, Ryou Bakura
- Yumi's Cells, Detective Cell, Ku Woong's Love cell, Ku Woong's Humor cell
- Zatch Bell!, Kiyomaro Takamine
- ZellyGo, Popo

=== Film animation ===
- Children Who Chase Lost Voices from Deep Below, Shin, Shun
- Honggildong 2084, Hong Il-dong
- Haikyu!! the Movie: Winners and Losers, Tōru Oikawa
- Haikyu!! Genius and Sense, Tōru Oikawa
- Hop, Fred O'Hare
- Inazuma Eleven: Saikyō Gundan Ōga Shūrai, Ichinose Kazuya, Shishido Sakichi, Tobitaka Seiya
- Inazuma Eleven GO: Kyūkyoku no Kizuna Gurifon, Mariya Kasaki
- Invader Zim: Enter the Florpus, Almighty Tallest Purple
- Madagascar 3: Europe's Most Wanted, Rico
- Metal Fight Beyblade vs the Sun: Sol Blaze, the Scorching Hot Invader, Tsubasa Otori
- Naruto the Movie: Blood Prison, Mui
- Ni No Kuni, haru
- One Piece: Stampede, Trafalgar Law
- Penguins of Madagascar, Private
- Pokémon: Arceus and the Jewel of Life, Arceus
- Pokémon the Movie: Secrets of the Jungle, Dr. Zed
- Sing, Miss Crawly
- Space Chimps 2: Zartog Strikes Back, Comet
- Space Jam: A New Legacy, Bugs Bunny
- The Story of Mr. Sorry, Choi Go-bong
- Toy Story 4, Forky
- Vivo, Vivo
- Wish Dragon, Pockets
- Zootopia, Nick Wilde

=== Video games ===
- 007: Quantum of Solace, Carter
- Apex Legends, Seer
- Blue Dragon, King Jibral
- Cookie Run: Kingdom, Vampire Cookie
- Diablo III, Imperius
- Dota 2, Ember Spirit
- Granado Espada, Scout, War Rock
- Grand Chase, Ronan
- Elsword, Add
- Halo: Reach, Jun-A266 (Noble Three)
- Huxley, Male Alternix
- Kingdom Under Fire: Circle of Doom, Leinhart
- League of Legends, Talon (The Blade's Shadow), Vladimir (The Crimson Reaper)
- Lost Ark, Carmine
- Lost Odyssey, Kaim Argonar
- MapleStory, Xenon, Gelimer, Checky, Aaron (Gerand Darmoor)
- ROHAN Online, Dahn
- Seven Knights, Dellons
- StarCraft, Siege Tank
- StarCraft II: Heart of the Swarm, Valerian Mengsk
- StarCraft II: Wings of Liberty, Crucio Siege Tank, Valerian Mengsk
- Stellar Blade, Adam
- TalesRunner, Harang
- World of Warcraft, Blood Elf, Kael'thas Sunstrider, Malakras

=== Dubbing ===
==== Film ====
- 3 Idiots, Rahul Kumar as Manmohan "MM" aka Millimeter/Centimeter
- All the Pretty Horses, Lucas Black as Jimmy Blevins
- The Amazing Spider-Man, Andrew Garfield as Peter Parker/Spider-Man
- Assault on Precinct 13, Ja Rule as Smiley
- Avengers: Endgame, Maximiliano Hernández as Jasper Sitwell
- The Bourne Legacy, Jeremy Renner as Aaron Cross/Kenneth James Kitsom/Dr. Karl Brundage/Outcome 5
- Bumblebee, Dylan O'Brien as Bumblebee
- The Butterfly Effect, William Lee Scott as Tommy Miller
- Camp Rock, Joe Jonas as Shane Gray
- Carrie, Ansel Elgort as Tommy Ross
- Captain America: The Winter Soldier, Maximiliano Hernández as Jasper Sitwell
- The Cat in the Hat, Sean Hayes as Mr. Humberfloob/The Fish
- Code 8, Stephen Amell as Garrett Kelton
- Con Air, Renoly Santiago as Ramon Martinez
- Coneheads, Chris Farley as Ronnie Bradford the Mechanic
- Constantine, Shia LaBeouf as Chas Kramer
- Cruella, John McCrea as Artie
- Crying Out Love, In the Center of the World, Mirai Moriyama as Sakutaro Matsumoto (High School)
- Don't Tempt Me, Gael García Bernal as Jack Davenport
- Election, Nicholas D'Agosto as Larry Fouch
- Eloise at Christmastime, Gavin Creel as Bill
- The Eye 2, Jesdaporn Pholdee as Sam
- Ghost World, Brad Renfro as Josh
- Gone in 60 Seconds, T.J. Cross as "Mirror Man"
- The Grudge, Jason Behr as Doug McCarthy
- Hidalgo, Victor Talmadge as Rau Rasmussen
- Hysteria, Hugh Dancy as Dr. Mortimer Granville
- Lawnmower Man 2: Beyond Cyberspace, Austin O'Brien as Peter Parkette
- Ong-Bak: Muay Thai Warrior, Cheathavuth Watcharakhun as Peng
- The Patriot, Tchéky Karyo as Major Jean Villeneuve
- The Road Home, Zheng Hao as Luo Changyu
- The Rock, Anthony Clark as Paul, Danny Nucci as Lieutenant Shephard
- Shallow Hal, Zen Gesner as Ralph
- Showtime, Mos Def as Lazy Boy
- Slap Her... She's French, Trent Ford as Ed Mitchell
- Snatch, Andy Beckwith as Errol
- Spy Kids 3D, Matt O'Leary as Gary Giggles
- Tall Girl, Luke Eisner as Stig Mohlin
- Teen Beach Movie, Ross Lynch as Brady
- Thor, Maximiliano Hernández as Jasper Sitwell
- To Gillian on Her 37th Birthday, Freddie Prinze Jr. as Joey Bost
- Zombies, Milo Manheim as Zed

==== Television show ====
- 24, Randle Mell as Brad Hammond (until the second season)
- The A List, Jacob Dudman(Series 1) and Barnaby Tobias(Series 2–present) as Dev
- CSI: Crime Scene Investigation, Archie Kao as Archie Johnson
- CSI: Miami, Adam Rodriguez as Eric Delko
- Julie and the Phantoms, Booboo Stewart as Willie
- Prison Break, Marshall Allman as Lincoln "L. J." Burrows Jr.
- How to Get Away with Murder, Jack Falahee as Connor Walsh

=== Tokusatsu ===
- Engine Sentai Go-onger, Renn Kōsaka
- Kamen Rider Decade, Tsukasa Kadoya
- Kamen Rider Ex-Aid, Kuroto Dan
- Mahō Sentai Magiranger, Kai Ozu
- Ultraman Geed, Leito Igaguri
- Ultraman X, Daichi Ozora

=== Narrations ===
- Consumer Report
- The World Is Now

=== TV appearances ===
- Tooni One Choice
- Beautiful Wishes
- Story Jobs

=== Film appearance ===
- Quiz King, News Reporter

=== Stage appearance ===
- Hyang-dan, Fly, Lee Mong-ryong

== See also ==
- Munhwa Broadcasting Corporation
- MBC Voice Acting Division
