= Dan Lanigan =

Dan Lanigan may refer to:

- Denis Lanigan, Australian rules footballer, sometimes listed as Dan Lanigan in some sources
- Dan Lanigan (producer), American film and television producer
