= Tiff Stevenson =

British stand-up comedian and actress

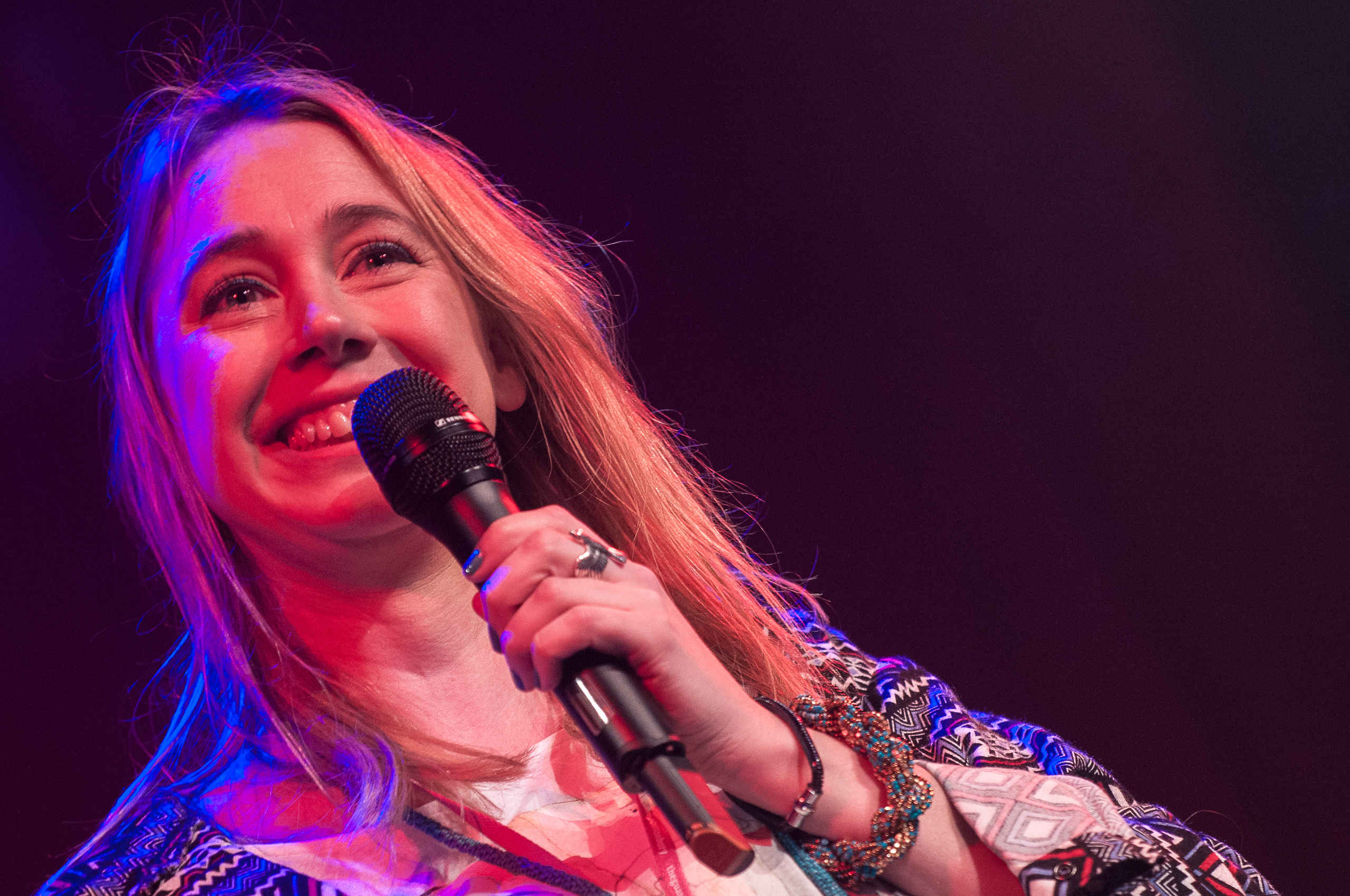
- Stevenson at the Glastonbury Festival 2015
- Born: Tiffany Stevenson; 29 September 1978 (age 47)
- Other name: Tiffany Stevenson-Oake
- Occupations: Comedian, actor
- Years active: 2000–present
- Website: tiffstevenson.co.uk

Tiffany Stevenson (born 29 September 1978) is an English stand-up comedian, writer and actress.

== Career ==
Stevenson started her career as an actress. Her credits include The Office, Days That Shook the World, People Just Do Nothing, Roisin Conaty's GameFace and Slotherhouse.

Stevenson has been doing stand-up comedy since 2006, which was also the year she first performed at the Edinburgh Fringe. Her solo debut was in Along Came A Spider (2009). Her subsequent Edinburgh shows were Dictators (2010), Cavewoman (2011), Uncomfortably Numb (2012), Optimist (2014), Mad Man (2015), Seven (2016), and Bombshell (2017). Bombshell was listed among the "Best-Reviewed Edinburgh Shows 2017". Her 2019 Edinburgh show was titled Mother, Stevenson planned to take it on tour in the UK and in the US after that year's festival.

She has been hosting the monthly comedy live show Old Rope in London where comedians showcase new material since 2009.

In 2011, Stevenson finished third on the ITV reality show Show Me the Funny.

Stevenson sings and plays the guitar. She sang with Craig Robinson at The Improv in Los Angeles in 2019 when he spontaneously asked her to join him on stage to do her "Stevie Nicks turns into Cartman" version of "Dreams". They had been introduced only minutes before because Robinson was on the US version of The Office and Stevenson was on the original UK show.

She hosts the podcast Catharsis and is a regular co-host of The Bugle.

== Personal life ==
Stevenson grew up in Greenford, West London. Her father is originally from Prestwick in Scotland but moved to England as a teenager. Her grandmother is from St. Andrews. Her husband Paul is also Scottish and frequently features in her stand-up shows as "Scottish Boyfriend Explains A Hing". She has a sister. Stevenson describes her parents' marriage as "a mixed-class relationship" because her father is from a wealthy Scottish-Presbyterian family and her mother is from a working-class Welsh-Kale Romani family.

Her father managed Wembley Stadium in the 1980s. When she was a young child she met stars like Annie Lennox and Freddie Mercury through her father's work at Wembley. Stevenson describes herself as "not really impressed by anyone" which she credits partly to meeting such stars frequently when she was very young and partly to becoming "jaded and cynical" when she saw many of her father's former friends disappearing from their lives after he had lost his job at Wembley. Very early on in her career, a manager told her to change her last name from Stevenson-Oake to just Stevenson because the double-barrelled name made her sound "posh".

Stevenson lives in North London with her husband and a cat.

== Filmography ==
=== Film ===
Year	Title	Role	Notes
2000	Spinning Candyfloss	Colleen Sykes	
2004	Swiss Passport	Heidi	Short films
2005	Cuts	Adult 1st Assistant Director	Short films
2006	Dead Clean	Laura	Short films
2010	Suggestive	Mary Chomp	Short films
2015	Hand It Back		Short films
2016	Neighbours from Hell	Joanna	
2019	Make a Killing	Handy Person	Short film
2023	Slotherhouse	Ms. Mayflower	
TBA	I'm Not You	Jackie	Post-production
TBA	Bleeding Poverty	Substitute Teacher	Post-production

=== Television ===
Year	Title	Role	Notes
2001	Chambers	Dawn	Series 2; episodes 1 & 2: "Conditional Fees" and "Survival Trek"
2001	The Office	Lorna	Series 1; episode 5: "New Girl"
2003	Goal	Maria	
2003	Absolute Power	Girl No. 3 (Anneka)	Series 1; episode 1: "History Man"
2004	Gaby & the Girls	Tamara	Also writer
2005	Footballers' Wive$ TV	Montana Mounds	Spin-off mockumentary comedy series to Footballers' Wives
2005	Days That Shook the World	Maisy Curtis	Series 3; episode 3: "Fact or Fiction: The War of the Worlds / Hitler Diaries"
2007	Comedy Cuts	Signer	
2013	Love Matters	London Eye Official	Episode 2: "Officially Special"
2015–2018	People Just Do Nothing	Tanya	Series 2–5; 14 episodes
2017	White Gold	Sharon Webb	Series 1; episode 4: "The Widow Maker"
2017–2019	GameFace	Tania	Series 1 & 2; 5 episodes
2021	The Cockfields	Claire	Series 2; episode 7: "Christmas Special"
2024	LMAOF	Herself	Series 2; episode 34: "LMAOF 64: Edinburgh"
