= Lisa Ambalavanar =

English actress

- Born: Lisa Hayley Ambalavanar; Derby, England
- Education: Liverpool Institute for Performing Arts
- Occupation: Actress
- Years active: 2009–present
- Notable work: Doctors; The A List

Lisa Hayley Ambalavanar is an English actress. She is known for her roles as Alia Hanif in the BBC soap opera Doctors (2018–2019) and Mia in the iPlayer and Netflix series The A List (2018–2021).

== Early life ==
Ambalavanar was born in Derby. She is of English and Sri Lankan heritage. She trained for one year at the Liverpool Institute for Performing Arts (LIPA) on the Performing Arts Diploma (Dance) course.

== Career ==
Ambalavanar made her professional debut in an episode of the BBC Two series Home Time in 2009, appearing as a shop assistant. She then made appearances in projects including short film Coffee (2011) and films The Stuff of Legend (2015) and Like Living (2016). Ambalavanar has also starred in various stage productions, including Painkillers (2014) and Singin' in the Rain (2016). For her performance in Singin' in the Rain, Philip Lowe of East Midlands Theatre wrote that she "lights up the stage with her attractive personality, her comic timing and some beautifully sung numbers".

In 2018, she was cast in the BBC daytime soap opera Doctors. She made her debut appearance as Alia Hanif on 7 February 2018; Alia was played by Mandy Thandi prior to Ambalavanar taking over the role. Later that year, she began appearing in the iPlayer and Netflix series The A List in the main role of Mia. In 2019, she made an appearance in a production of A View from the Bridge, in which she was described as "forthright, headstrong and full of energy" by Julie Bayley of Derbyshire Live. Later that year, she portrayed the role of Fairy Wiseheart in a production of Sleeping Beauty.

Starting in 2022, she appears as Jinx in season 4 of Titans on HBO Max. In 2023, she starred as Emily Young in the 2023 horror comedy film Slotherhouse.

== Filmography ==
Television and film roles
Year	Title	Role	Notes
2009	Home Time	Shop Assistant	1 episode
2014	Welcome Home	Jenny	Film
2015	The Stuff of Legend	Tessa	Film
2018–2019	Doctors	Alia Hanif	Recurring role
2018, 2021	The A List	Mia	Main role
2022–2023	Titans	Jinx	Recurring role (season 4)
2023	Slotherhouse	Emily Young	Film
2024	Father Brown	Annabel Binky	Series 12: Episode 4

== Stage ==
Year	Title	Role	Venue
2014	Painkillers	Julie	Fifth Word Theatre
2016	Singin' in the Rain	Kathy Selden	Nottingham Arts Theatre
2019	A View from the Bridge	Catherine	Fourblokes
2019	Sleeping Beauty	Fairy Wiseheart	Nottingham Playhouse
2022	Dick Whittington	Dick Whittington	Nottingham Playhouse
2023	Noises Off	Brooke	UK Tour
2024	The Deep Blue Sea	Ann	Theatre Royal, Bath
2025	The Deep Blue Sea	Ann	Theatre Royal Haymarket
