= West Texas Investors Club =

American reality television series (2015–2016)

- Genre: Documentary; Reality
- Starring: Mike 'Rooster' McConaughey; Wayne 'Butch' Gilliam
- Country of origin: United States
- Original language: English
- No. of seasons: 2
- No. of episodes: 18

Production
- Executive producers: Charlie Ebersol; Jason Henry; Dan Lanigan
- Camera setup: Multiple
- Running time: 60 minutes (inc. adverts)
- Production company: The Ebersol Lanigan Company

Original release
- Network: CNBC
- Release: August 4, 2015 – August 3, 2016

West Texas Investors Club is an American reality documentary television series that aired on CNBC from August 4, 2015, to August 3, 2016. The series follows self-made millionaires Mike 'Rooster' McConaughey and Wayne 'Butch' Gilliam meeting entrepreneurs in Texas, offering them the chance to pitch their products and secure funding from Rooster and Butch. The eight part hour-long series was commissioned by CNBC in January 2015 and is produced by The Ebersol Lanigan Company.

Both hosts Mike 'Rooster' McConaughey and Wayne 'Butch' Gilliam made their fortune largely from oil related businesses. Gil Prather, a musician, also features in the series. Rooster is the older brother of actor Matthew McConaughey.

In the first season of the series, McConaughey and Gilliam invested a total of US$1.97 million.

== Broadcast ==
The series premiered in the United States on CNBC on August 4, 2015, with episodes airing each week. The series was renewed for a second season in September 2015, which premiered on June 7, 2016.

== Episodes ==
=== Season 1 (2015) ===
| No. overall | No. in season | Title | Original release date | U.S. viewers |
|---|---|---|---|---|
| 1 | 1 | "The Good, the App, and the Ugly" | August 4, 2015 | 462,000 |
Butch and Rooster consider investing in an app that could change the bar scene and a new device that could help reduce human contact with germs.
| 2 | 2 | "A Time to Grill" | August 11, 2015 | 349,000 |
The guys put an internet star to the test who claims to have the best barbecue sauce, and a single mom pitches a website designed to help prepare college funds.
| 3 | 3 | "The Quick and the Fed" | August 18, 2015 | 228,000 |
The guys consider helping a pickle entrepreneur and test a food truck manufacturer by sending him out on an unusual call.
| 4 | 4 | "A Girl Named Lou" | August 25, 2015 | 369,000 |
Rooster and Butch find people to test a natural hangover cure and a specially designed pillow that helps people sleep.
| 5 | 5 | "High Planes Drifter" | September 1, 2015 | 273,000 |
The guys find themselves in unfamiliar territory when testing an invention, and are pitched an air travel app by a pilot.
| 6 | 6 | "Showdown at Pie Noon" | September 8, 2015 | 285,000 |
Rooster and Butch could be outsmarted by a tech-savvy entrepreneur, and Rooster's mom challenges a pastry chef.
| 7 | 7 | "Butch, Rooster, and the Sunglass Kids" | September 15, 2015 | 204,000 |
At a goat-roping event, Rooster and Butch try out an eyewear product from two Californian entrepreneurs, and then get pitched a smartphone repair venture by an ex-rock star.
| 8 | 8 | "Dances with Undershirts" | September 22, 2015 | N/A |

=== Season 2 (2016) ===
| No. overall | No. in season | Title | Original release date | U.S. viewers |
|---|---|---|---|---|
| 9 | 1 | "The Last Pitcher Show" | June 7, 2016 | 370,000 |
| 10 | 2 | "Escape From West Texas" | June 14, 2016 | 289,000 |
| 11 | 3 | "The Magnificent Six-pack" | June 21, 2016 | 321,000 |
| 12 | 4 | "Little Heart on the Prairie" | June 28, 2016 | N/A |
| 13 | 5 | "Some Don't Like It Hot" | July 5, 2016 | N/A |
| 14 | 6 | "The Golden Nuggets" | July 12, 2016 | N/A |
| 15 | 7 | "All Kaptured on the Western Front" | July 19, 2016 | N/A |
| 16 | 8 | "Cup in Smoke" | July 26, 2016 | N/A |
| 17 | 9 | "Tree Amigos" | August 2, 2016 | 291,000 |
| 18 | 10 | "Natural Born Chillers" | August 3, 2016 | N/A |
