= Sydney Craven =

English actress (born 1994)

- Born: 25 July 1994 (age 32); Bexleyheath, London, England
- Education: ArtsEd
- Occupation: Actress
- Years active: 2014–present

Sydney Craven (born 25 July 1994) is an English actress and former taekwondo athlete. Following a recurring role in the CBBC series Wolfblood, she was cast as school bully Alexandra D'Costa in the BBC soap opera EastEnders in 2017. Following her appearance on the soap, she has appeared in various films and has worked as a voice actress. In her youth, Craven represented England at the Commonwealth Taekwondo Championships; she was crowned the junior female champion and held the title for 12 years.

== Life and career ==
Craven was born on 25 July 1994 in Bexleyheath. She grew up in the nearby town of Barnehurst, where she attended Erith Secondary School. Throughout her youth, she was a taekwondo athlete. Her achievements in the sport included being crowned the Commonwealth junior female champion at age 14, having represented England in the 14 to 18 age group at the Commonwealth Taekwondo Championships, and having won numerous medals of different colours at competitions in Portugal, Holland, and Belgium. She held the title for 12 years. Following secondary school, she trained at ArtsEd in London.

In 2016, Craven made her television debut in the CBBC series Wolfblood. She appeared in a recurring role until 2017. Later in 2017, Craven was cast as Alexandra D'Costa in the BBC soap opera EastEnders. Her character was brought in alongside Madison Drake (Seraphina Beh) and the pair acted as bullies towards characters Louise Mitchell (Tilly Keeper) and Bex Fowler (Jasmine Armfield). She responded to criticism by one fan by arguing that the character was intended to help educate. The characters were written out after they pushed Louise onto an array of lit candles.

After her EastEnders role, she voiced a character in A Christmas Carol (2020) and appeared in York Witches' Society (2022). 2022 saw Craven star in Jeepers Creepers: Reborn, a horror film. She also continued her voice work in 2022, voicing characters in Salvage Marines and Tangranimals. Then in 2023, she appeared in the slasher film Slotherhouse as "mean girl antagonist" Brianna.

== Filmography ==
Year	Title	Role	Notes
2015	Native	Sarah	Short film
2016–2017	Wolfblood	Hannah	Recurring role
2016	Suspicion	Skylar Neese	Episode: "A Daughter Disappears"
2017	Five by Five	Toni	Recurring role
2017	EastEnders	Alexandra D'Costa	Regular role
2017	Come Out of the Woods	Cara	Short film
2020	A Christmas Carol	Martha (voice)	Film
2022	York Witches' Society	Kirsten	Film
2022	Salvage Marines	Flight Deck (voice)	Recurring role
2022	Jeepers Creepers: Reborn	Laine	Film
2022	Tangranimals	Kazu / Oula (voices)	Main roles
2023	The Phoebus Files	Tina	Episode: "The Judgement of Paris"
2023	Slotherhouse	Brianna	Film

== Stage ==
Year	Title	Role	Venue
2014	As You Like It	Phoebe	ArtsEd
2014	Vernon God Little	Pam / Lally's Mum	ArtsEd
2015	Spring Awakening	Isle	ArtsEd
