= Dan Lanigan (producer) =

American producer & writer

Dan Lanigan is an American film and television producer, writer, director, actor and film historian. He owns a production company, Cinema Relics, and is most notably the host of Disney's Prop Culture.

== Career ==
Lanigan began his television career as a creator of Race to the Scene, a 2013 reality series hosted by Dolph Lundgren that features teams of contestants who race to historic movie locations by performing stunts from blockbuster movies like Pulp Fiction and Terminator. He also served as Executive Producer on the TV series West Texas Investors Club and Mystery Science Theater 3000: The Return.

In 2020, Lanigan hosted the Disney+ series Prop Culture. In the docuseries, Dan explores and showcases costumes, set designs, music, and props from various Disney films, and meets with stars like Rick Moranis, Christopher Lloyd, and the cast of The Chronicles of Narnia: The Lion, the Witch and the Wardrobe.

Lanigan co-directed and produced the 2020 mockumentary feature film Izzy Lyon: The Unspun Truth. He also executive-produced the 2023 horror film Slotherhouse, which aired on Hulu and released in Regal Cinemas in the United States.

== Film Historian ==
Lanigan has been collecting movie props and costumes for over 25 years. He first became interested in film props when he saw screen-used movie artifacts on display at Disney's MGM Studios. Dan has collected over 6,000 artifacts in his Cinema Relics archive and is dedicated to preserving film history.

In 2025, Lanigan began a YouTube series called Cinema Relics: Investigations where he and his team share pieces from the collection and investigate the history of these iconic props.

=== Artifacts in the Cinema Relics Archives ===
- Original Jack Skellington puppets and set pieces from The Nightmare Before Christmas
- Toon Pistol from Roger Rabbit
- Indiana Jones’ Whip from Indiana Jones
- Marty McFly’s Hoverboard from Back to the Future 2
- Keanu Reeves’ costume from The Matrix
- Aragorn’s Strider Sword from Lord of the Rings
- Will Ferrell’s Buddy the Elf Costume from Elf
- Deckard's Blaster from Blade Runner
- John Belushi's Suit from The Blues Brothers
- The Golden Fertility Idol from Raiders of the Lost Ark
- Ghostbusters Proton Pack

== Filmography ==
=== Film ===
- Izzy Lyon: The Unspun Truth
- Slotherhouse
- Fan-O-Rama

=== Television ===
- Prop Culture
- The Profit
- West Texas Investors Club
- Rooster & Butch
- They Took Our Child: We Got Her Back
- Race to the Scene
- Nickelodeon Superstar Slime Showdown at Super Bowl
- The Moment
