= Auto-B-Good =

American animated series (2005-2006)

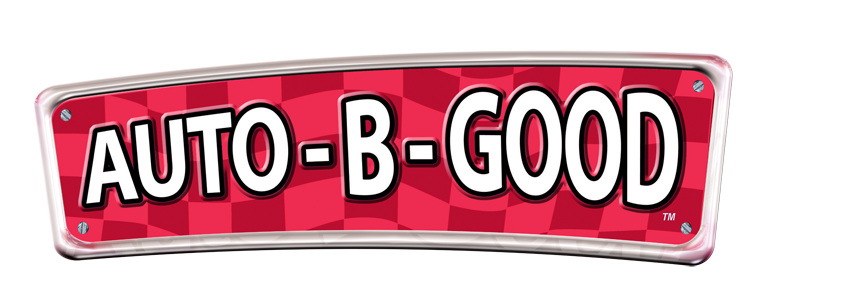
- Genre: Kids
- Written by: John Ingelin
- Story by: Kevin Nelson
- Directed by: Handen Jetmall (voice director); Charles Meyer; Gary Meyer; Joth Loder (animation)
- Voices of: Teri Parker-Brown; Sabrina Crews; Jim Cunningham; John Farrell; Heidi Fellner; Len Goodman; Charles Hubbell; Kim Kivens; Dave Simmons
- Composer: Phil Aaron
- Country of origin: United States
- Original language: English
- No. of seasons: 2
- No. of episodes: 63 (list of episodes)

Production
- Cinematography: Dan Becker; Tom Smith
- Editor: Charles Meyer
- Camera setup: Charles Thompson; Joe Dennis; Jim May
- Running time: 11 minutes
- Production companies: Wet Cement Productions; GoldKing Media

Original release
- Network: Syndication
- Release: January 17, 2005 – February 27, 2006

Auto-B-Good is a 2005-2006 American animated children's television series. The series features short stories set in the fictional City of Auto, in which all the citizens are cars. The program is explicitly designed to teach children lessons in moral character and values. Auto-B-Good was produced by Wet Cement Productions. The show aired on certain PBS stations through PBS Kids before moving to Smile of a Child/TBN, where it aired until early 2019.

The show is aimed at children ages 3 to 8.

== Characters ==
=== Main ===
Issadora

- Model: 1957 BMW Isetta 300

Issadora (Izzi) is the main protagonist of the series. She is an innocent and curious 7-year-old car who loves to play with EJ, but can get frustrated at being the littlest and not always able to do what the others can.

Johnny

- Model: 2003 Dodge Viper

Johnny drives fast and keeps his finish clean. His friends are Derek, Cali, Maria, and Miles. He frequently visits Squeakies Car Wash to clean his vehicle.

Cali

- Model: 1999 Mercedes-Benz R170

Cali is a valley girl. She spends time with Johnny and Maria and enjoys shopping.

EJ

- Model: 1974 Morris Mini

One of the “little cars,” Eric Jacobson "EJ" Mini puts full effort into everything he does. He tries hard to keep up with the bigger cars and wants to be just like Johnny when he grows up. His best friend is his classmate Izzi.

Professor

- Model: 1950 Citroën 2CV

The Professor creates various inventions, though they frequently malfunction. Characterized as eccentric and analytical, he is portrayed as friendly and well-regarded by the other characters.

Franklin

- Model: 1931 Tatra T80

Old and wise, Franklin has lived a full life and draws on his experience to give advice on almost anything. He and the Professor are good friends, and both act as mentors to the “kids.”

Miles

- Model: 1970 Volkswagen Karmann Ghia

Miles is the conscience of the group; he knows what is right and tries to steer the others in that direction. His maturity gives a balance to his friendship with Johnny and Cali.

Maria

- Model: 2003 Jeep Liberty

With her love of adventure and four-wheeling, Maria is the trailblazer of the group. She coaches the little cars' soccer team and has a job at the park. Maria is friends with Derek.

Derek

- Model: 2000 Dodge Ram 3500 Regular Cab

Derek is a red pickup truck. He is the biggest, strongest, and toughest of the group. With his mild manner and gentle spirit, Derek is often the group's peacemaker and mediator.

=== Minor ===
Elrod

- Model: 1923 Austin 7

Elrod, who is a century old, fought in the great war with CJ Willy, Franklin, and Mr. Morgan. He lived alone for many years after the war and later reconciled with his friends. He is the owner and operator of Elrod's Mini Golf.

CJ Willy

- Model: 1942 Willys MB

CJ Willy was the drill instructor and sergeant in charge of Franklin, Mr. Morgan, and Elrod during the great war. He was killed in the line of duty, and his image is cast in bronze as the statue in Memorial Park.

Lug Nut

- Model: 1934 Triumph Dolomite

Lug Nut is a vaudeville performer who, along with his comedy partner, Dip Stick, teaches Miles that enthusiasm is the secret of success.

Billy

- Billy was lost in the wilderness at a young age and was raised by Big Horns. When the other cars found him on a camping trip, they brought him back to the City of Auto and learned to see all the wonderful things in their city through new eyes.

Mr. Morgan

- Model: 1939 BMW 328

Mr. Morgan is the sports referee.

== Cast ==
- Sabrina Crews as Izzi
- Charles Hubbell as Johnny
- Heidi Fellner as Cali
- Teri Parker-Brown as Maria
- Jim Cunningham as Derek
- Kim Kivens as EJ
- Dave Simmons as Miles (same voice used for Noils in Ewe Know)
- John Farrell as Franklin
- Len Goodman as Professor

== Episodes ==
The first season consisted of 36 episodes, each focusing on a particular character trait.

=== Season 1 (2005) ===
Overall #	Episode Title	Air Date
1	Timely Treats	January 17, 2005
2	Picture Perfect	January 17, 2005
3	Moving Forward Together	January 17, 2005
4	Growing Responsible	January 24, 2005
5	Red Card To Respect	January 24, 2005
6	The Land of the Odds	January 24, 2005
7	No Rules Allowed	January 31, 2005
8	Shop 'Til You Drop	January 31, 2005
9	Center of the Universe	January 31, 2005
10	Slippery Slope	February 7, 2005
11	Car Tune Pirates	February 7, 2005
12	Bully Bully	February 7, 2005
13	Friends in High Places	February 14, 2005
14	Heavenly Event	February 14, 2005
15	Sunny Side Up?	February 14, 2005
16	Up from the Depths	February 21, 2005
17	Cooler Heads Prevail	February 21, 2005
18	Digging For Gold	February 21, 2005
19	A Miles In Their Tires	February 28, 2005
20	Stage Fright	February 28, 2005
21	Izzi and The Giant	February 28, 2005
22	Rumors of War	March 7, 2005
23	The Price of Freedom	March 7, 2005
24	No Greater Love	March 7, 2005
25	Miles to the Rescue	March 14, 2005
26	The Secret Force	March 14, 2005
27	Gopher It!	March 14, 2005
28	The Secret of Success	March 21, 2005
29	The Winning Goal	March 21, 2005
30	The Road Rage	March 21, 2005
31	Road Test For Maturity	March 28, 2005
32	Uninvited Guests	March 28, 2005
33	A Tidy Plan	March 28, 2005
34	Too Rough Around The Edges	April 4, 2005
35	Crowning Car Of The Year	April 4, 2005
36	Friends To The Rescue!	April 4, 2005

=== Season 2 (2006) ===
Wet Cement completed 27 episodes for the second season.

Season 2 #	Episode Title	Air Date
1	Movie "FX"	January 2, 2006
2	Cheaters U-Turn	January 2, 2006
3	The Cobra Canyon Leap	January 2, 2006
4	The Integrity Project	January 9, 2006
5	Rising To The Occasion	January 9, 2006
6	The Gift of Golf	January 9, 2006
7	Breaking Par	January 16, 2006
8	Daring Dreamers	January 16, 2006
9	Unusual Suspect	January 16, 2006
10	The Missing Statue	January 23, 2006
11	Get the OOMPH!	January 23, 2006
12	A Taxing Problem	January 23, 2006
13	Billy and the Big Horns	January 30, 2006
14	Home Sweet Home	January 30, 2006
15	The Quest For Power	January 30, 2006
16	Monster Trap!	February 6, 2006
17	CAR-Nival	February 6, 2006
18	Lug Nut	February 6, 2006
19	Issadora's Box	February 13, 2006
20	Extreme Overhaul	February 13, 2006
21	Breaking New Ground	February 13, 2006
22	Level Thirty-Nine!	February 20, 2006
23	Western Hero	February 20, 2006
24	COTU Comics	February 20, 2006
25	Scared-y Car	February 27, 2006
26	Car Tuned & Ready	February 27, 2006
27	Squeaky Clean!	February 27, 2006

== DVD Versions ==
Auto-B-Good DVDs were released in three versions: a retail version for home audiences, an education version for use in school classrooms, and a Special Edition that includes Christian music videos featuring the music of Rick Altizer. These videos add a spiritual application to the character lessons.

== Storybooks ==
In 2009, Rising Star Studios produced six children's storybooks, written by Phillip Walton. Each is an original story focusing on lessons in trustworthiness, respect, caring, responsibility, citizenship and fairness.

- EJ and the Bully (a lesson in Respect)
- Queen for a Day (a lesson in Fairness)
- Citizen Miles (a lesson in Citizenship)
- Sticking to it! (a lesson in Trustworthiness)
- Mean Ole Crankfender (a lesson in Caring)
- Attack of the Runaway Robot (a lesson in Responsibility)
