= Jacob Dudman =

English actor (born 1997)

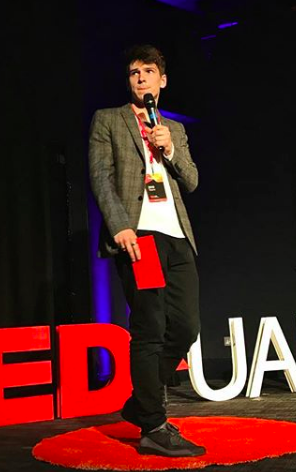
- Born: Jacob Stanley Dudman; 22 August 1997 (age 29); Ripon, North Yorkshire, England
- Education: London College of Communication
- Occupations: Actor; writer; filmmaker
- Years active: 2017–present

Jacob Stanley Dudman (born 22 August 1997) is an English actor, writer and filmmaker. He is known for his roles in Alan Bennett's The Choral(2025), American sitcom Scrubs (2026-), Netflix programs The Stranger (2020), The Last Kingdom: Seven Kings Must Die (2023), Medici (2019), Fate: The Winx Saga (2021–2022) and the BBC iPlayer series The A List (2018).

== Early life ==
Dudman grew up in Ripon, North Yorkshire. He attended St Aidan's Church of England High School. He then studied Film Production at the London College of Communication, a branch of University of the Arts London.

== Career ==
=== Filmmaking and YouTube ===
As a teenager, Dudman uploaded short films, impressions and comedic sketches on his YouTube channel, which gained him over 100,000 subscribers. In 2016, Dudman co-directed the 23-minute documentary Save The Rhino Vietnam, in which he and actor Paul Blackthorne travelled to Vietnam to investigate the rhino horn trade and raise awareness for the rhino-extinction plight.

In 2023, Dudman set up HG4 Productions, a northern based Film Production company, focused on 'amplifying storytelling voices from the North of England'.

=== Voice Acting ===
Dudman has voiced the roles of the Tenth, Eleventh and Twelfth Doctors as part of the Doctor Who audio drama range for Big Finish Productions. He has voiced many other roles for different Big Finish titles, including the Doctor Who main range. In 2020, Dudman narrated the short film Farewell, Sarah Jane written by Russell T Davies, which was aired on the anniversary of Elisabeth Sladen's death. He quit being the Eleventh Doctor and the Twelfth Doctor after 7 years in the role, with his final boxset released in March 2024.

Dudman has since given voice to various television series such as HBO's Emmy winning series Primal and Genndy Tartakovsky's Unicorn: Warriors Eternal.

=== Acting ===
In 2018, Dudman was cast as Dev in The A List, a BBC iPlayer original series. Later in the year, Dudman played a role in the third season of Medici as Giulio de Medici, released in December 2019. In 2019, Dudman joined the cast of The Stranger (based on a Harlan Coben novel) and Fate: The Winx Saga (based on the Italian Nickelodeon cartoon Winx Club).

Dudman played supporting lead Clyde in Alan Bennett's The Choral, released in 2025 from Sony Pictures Classics, where he starred alongside Ralph Fiennes, Simon Russell Beale and Roger Allam. The film was directed by Nicholas Hytner.

Dudman began playing medical intern Asher Green in the revival season of the American sitcom Scrubs in 2026. He will return to that role in season eleven. In 2026, he played Mickey, the young fiancé of Judy Garland, in the stage play End of the Rainbow at Soho Theatre Walthamstow.

== Filmography and Synchronization ==
Year	Title	Role	Notes
2018	The A List	Dev	Season 1
2019	Medici	Giulio de' Medici	Season 3
2020	The Stranger	Thomas Price	Main role, 8 episodes
2021	Forza Horizon 5	Tristian Westfield-Bourne	Voice, video game
2021–2022	Fate: The Winx Saga	Sam Harvey	Recurring role (season 1); main role (season 2)
2022	Primal	Charles, Stevens	Voice, episode: "The Primal Theory"
2023	Bad Habits	Blake	Main role, short
2023	The Last Kingdom: Seven Kings Must Die	Osbert	Netflix film
2023	Unicorn: Warriors Eternal	Edred	Voice, episode: "The Awakening"
2023	Dark Season: Legacy Rising	Jack Parton	Podcast series
2024	Untethered	The Nameless Man	Main role, short
2025	The Choral	Clyde	Recurring role
2025	Marvel Cosmic Invasion	Ka-Zar, Klaw	Voice, vdeo game
2026	Scrubs	Asher	Recurring role (Season 1 and 2)
2026	End of the Rainbow	Mickey	Stage play, main role
2026	Game of Thrones: War for Westeros	Robb Stark	
2026	Hunter's Moon	Christopher Talbot	Voice, video game
