= Slotherhouse =

2023 horror-comedy film by Matthew Goodhue

- Theatrical release poster
- Directed by: Matthew Goodhue
- Written by: Bradley Fowler
- Story by: Bradley Fowler; Cady Lanigan
- Produced by: Cady Lanigan; Bradley Fowler; Mark David
- Starring: Lisa Ambalavanar; Sydney Craven; Olivia Rouyre; Bianca Beckles-Rose; Tiff Stevenson; Stefan Kapičić
- Cinematography: Mark David
- Edited by: Mike Mendez; Matthew Goodhue
- Music by: Sam Ewing
- Production companies: Renegade Studios Chicago; Cinema Relics Productions; Buffalo Speedway Film Co.; Talking Wolf Productions
- Distributed by: Gravitas Ventures
- Release date: August 30, 2023
- Running time: 93 minutes
- Countries: United States; Serbia
- Language: English

Slotherhouse is a 2023 horror-comedy film starring Lisa Ambalavanar, Sydney Craven, Olivia Rouyre, Bianca Beckles-Rose, Tiff Stevenson and Stefan Kapičić. Directed by Matthew Goodhue, and written by Bradley Fowler and Cady Lanigan, the film was released on August 30, 2023. It is an international co-production between the United States and Serbia.

== Premise ==
A college student, Emily Young, takes a three-toed sloth named Alpha out of the jungle to gain popularity at her sorority, only for Alpha to go on rampant killing spree.

== Cast ==
- Lisa Ambalavanar as Emily
- Sydney Craven as Brianna
- Andrew Horton as Tyler
- Bianca Beckles-Rose as Zenny
- Olivia Rouyre as Madison
- Tiff Stevenson as Ms. Mayflower
- Sutter Nolan as Sarah
- Milica Vrzic as Gabby
- Stefan Kapičić as Oliver
- Annamaria Serda as Dakota
- Grace Patterson as Chloe
- Kelly Lynn Reiter as Ava
- Tiana Upcheva as Alissa
- Bradley Fowler as a paramedic
- Cady Lanigan as Morgan
- Rudi Rok as Alpha

Additionally, the main puppeteers credited are: Gregory B. Ballora, Jackson Pike and Tony Carrillo.

== Production ==
The concept for Slotherhouse originated when the film's co-writer, Bradley Fowler, tried to come up with the "dumbest idea" he could think of. Cady Lanigan described the concept as "like Mean Girls meets Happy Death Day with a touch of Gremlins". Lanigan stated that the film was inspired by classic horror films and their use of practical effects.

== Release ==
Slotherhouse was released on August 30, 2023 by Gravitas Ventures in Regal Cinemas theaters in the United States.

== Reception ==
On the review aggregator website Rotten Tomatoes, 56% of 18 critics' reviews are positive, with an average rating of 5.6/10.

Stuart Heritage from The Guardian described it as a "masterpiece", praising its humor as "tremendously funny" and stating that it surpasses all expectations. Christy Lemire from RogerEbert.com gave the film a score of three out of four, while Sam Haysom from Mashable said that the film had "irritating dialogue" and "one-dimensional characters". William Earl from Variety stated that, "This killer sloth creature feature isn't funny or scary enough to justify its thin premise".
