= The A List (2018 TV series) =

British television series

- Genre: Teen drama; Mystery; Thriller
- Created by: Dan Berlinka; Nina Metivier
- Starring: Lisa Ambalavanar; Ellie Duckles; Savannah Baker; Cian Barry; Eleanor Bennett; Jacob Dudman; Benjamin Nugent; Rosie Dwyer; Jack Kane; Max Lohan; Nneka Okoye; Micheal Ward; Georgina Sadler; Indianna Ryan; Dan Brady; Byron Easman; Barnaby Tobias; Finty Williams
- Composer: Nick Foster
- Country of origin: United Kingdom
- Original language: English
- No. of series: 2
- No. of episodes: 21

Production
- Executive producers: Anne Brogan; Dan Berklina; Nina Metivier
- Producers: Sandra MacIver; Matt Anderson
- Production location: Scotland
- Running time: 25–26 minutes
- Production company: Kindle Entertainment

Original release
- Network: BBC iPlayer
- Release: 25 October 2018
- Network: Netflix
- Release: 25 June 2021

The A List is a British teen thriller television series created by Dan Berlinka and Nina Metivier, released on BBC iPlayer on 25 October 2018. The central character is Mia (Lisa Ambalavanar), who arrives at a summer camp on an island that turns out to hold dark secrets. The series was released internationally on Netflix on 30 August 2019. In December 2019, the BBC pulled out of the project and it was announced that the series would move to Netflix for the second series. The second series premiered on Netflix on 25 June 2021.

== Cast ==
- Lisa Ambalavanar as Mia Blackwood
- Ellie Duckles as Amber
- Savannah Baker as Kayleigh
- Cian Barry as Dave (main series 1; guest series 2)
- Eleanor Bennett as Jenna
- Jacob Dudman (series 1) and Barnaby Tobias (series 2) as Dev
- Benjamin Nugent as Harry
- Rosie Dwyer as Alex
- Jack Kane as Zac Young
- Max Lohan as Luka
- Nneka Okoye as Mags (series 1)
- Micheal Ward as Brendan (main series 1; guest series 2)
- Georgina Sadler as Petal
- Indianna Ryan as Marguerite "Midge" Rayne
- Dylan Brady as Sam Sutherland (series 2)
- Byron Easman as Fitz (series 2)
- Finty Williams as Dr. Shaw (series 2)
- Abbie Hirst as Dr. Kelman

== Episodes ==
=== Series overview ===
Series	Episodes	Originally released	Network
1	13	25 October 2018	BBC iPlayer
2	8	25 June 2021	Netflix

=== Series 1 (2018) ===
No. overall	No. in series	Title	Directed by	Written by	Original release date
1	1	"Here She Is at Last"	Patrick Harkins	Dan Berlinka & Nina Metivier	25 October 2018
A group of teenagers arrive for a summer on Peregrine Island. Mia and Kayleigh bond over their shared interest of fashion and become roommates alongside Alex. While playing an icebreaker game, Amber arrives late and Mia immediately takes a dislike to her. Mia organises a party and does not invite Amber. While playing capture the flag, Amber pretends to trip on the rope bridge, asking Mia to help her up. Mia lends her hand, but Amber purposely falls in the river to make the campmates dislike Mia. While in the shower, Mia finds Kayleigh cutting the majority of her hair off with scissors, with Amber ominously watching over her. As a gesture of goodwill, Mia invites Amber to her party but she declines, so she cancels the party. Mia later learns that Amber has reorganised the party and confronts her on a cliffside, where Amber jumps off. A frustrated Mia goes to inform the other campmates that Amber has jumped from the cliff, but is shocked to find an uninjured Amber.
2	2	"Take Back Control"	Patrick Harkins	Dan Berlinka & Nina Metivier	25 October 2018
Mia waits for a ferry to leave the island but is informed that it will not arrive for several days. Mia confides in camp leader Mags that she does not want to be around Amber, who responds by holding a healing circle. Amber and Mia pretend to make up to please Mags, and Mia later plants Mags' ring on Amber to incriminate her. When Mags confronts Amber, she convinces Mags that she allowed her to borrow the ring, leaving Mia and Alex confused. Harry accompanies Alex on an adventure to find a mysterious green light, where they find a strange sound and rumbling from underneath the woods.
3	3	"To Become a Queen"	Patrick Harkins	Kate Davidson	25 October 2018
When the camp hosts a contest for the queen of midsommar, Alex expresses disinterest due to it being rooted in heteronormativity. Alex goes out on a walk where they meet campmate Petal and the two bond over their shared interest in mysteries. Mia realises that she cannot beat Amber in the queen contest and decides to campaign for campmate Jenna to win. Jenna hands out cake to encourage people to vote for her, until Amber manipulates her into thinking her cake is rotten. Jenna runs around taking the cake back, meaning campmates vote for Amber instead. Amber is crowned, leaving Jenna furious. Mia and Dev leave the midsommar celebrations to go to the woods.
4	4	"Capture the King"	Patrick Harkins	Nina Metivier	25 October 2018
Wanting to crown Dev as her king, Amber sets off to find him and Mia in the woods, where she overhears the two planning a date. While at the party, Amber manipulates all of the guests into partying, leading Jenna to kiss Harry. Petal takes a photo of the two and Jenna is ridiculed by the group. Alex expresses a disinterest in the party and is branded a loser by Petal, leading Alex to feel betrayed. Mia waits for Dev to arrive for their date while Amber messes with his sense of direction so that he does not arrive.
5	5	"In for the Kill"	Patrick Harkins	Dan Berlinka	25 October 2018
While in the woods, Mia meets a strange man. He tells Mia that if she brings him food and supplies from the camp, he will show her to a spot in the woods where there is phone signal. Dev finds his and Mia's initials engraved on a log in the woods and asked if she did it; she denies doing it and questions who did it. Mia confronts Amber, who retaliates by putting Mia in the frame for destroying her dress and throwing paint over her. The campmates turn against Mia, while Amber watches on in joy.
6	6	"Far from Home"	Patrick Harkins	Dan Berlinka & Nina Metivier	25 October 2018
Wanting to leave Peregrine Island, Mia begs Mags and Dave to allow her to leave, but they decline, wanting her to face the consequences for believing she threw paint over Amber. They tell her to return to her cabin, but she chooses an isolated cabin away from the other campers. Alex visits Mia in the cabin, where they discover that a former camper named Midge died on the island a year prior to their visit.
7	7	"Nothing Can Survive Alone"	Jim Shields	Dan Berlinka	25 October 2018
Amber manipulates Mia into believing she is at home with her parents and tries to find out what she knows about Midge's death. Amber then hosts a party for the campmates, which is interrupted by Brendan who has found a watch with Dev's name on it. Amber embarrasses Jenna by manipulating her into exposing that her boyfriend is imaginary. Petal tries to kiss Alex, but Alex declines her advances, claiming they are not gay. Alex witnesses Amber controlling Dave's mind and despite Amber trying to manipulate Alex, it does not work. Alex then visits Mia to inform her of what happened.
8	8	"All That's Left of Us"	Jim Shields	Kate Davidson	25 October 2018
Dev experiences memories of the former summer at Peregrine Island, which Amber is annoyed by, claiming he should not be able to remember. Mia, Alex and Harry discover a lab in the woods and wonder if Amber has involvement with it. As they speak aloud about their plans to take her down, Kayleigh overhears and runs to tell Amber. As she runs, she collides with a branch and collapses. Upon her awakening, she remembers memories of her romance with Zac from the previous summer.
9	9	"Who You Used to Be"	Jim Shields	Nina Metivier	25 October 2018
Kayleigh tries to inform Zac of her recently found memories, but he does not believe her, so she tries to persuade Mia instead, who also does not believe her. Kayleigh finds a photo to prove what she is saying, informing Mia and Alex that Amber wiped all of the campmates memories after Midge's death. Mia instructs her to continue to playing as Amber's friend, but Amber realises that Kayleigh has remembered the previous summer and regains control of her. Mia and Alex realise that Amber is onto them and decide to reach out to Midge for help. They ask Midge why Amber killed her, who responds by carving into a branch that she is still alive.
10	10	"Poison"	Jim Shields	Kate Davidson	25 October 2018
Petal finds Alex trying to find Midge, and after accompanying Alex, the two conclude that Midge's spirit is alive through the plants on the island. Kayleigh gives Zac the photo from the previous summer, and when Amber learns he has it, she manipulates him into giving it to her. She later burns the photo. Mia and Alex plan to leave the island and realising that Luka knows a way to get off the island, she helps him. Mia discovers that he has a boat but it has a hole in. When passing by a river, Mia finds a bag of the campmates' phones, realising that they have no way to communicate with the mainland.
11	11	"What You Left Behind"	Jim Shields	Nina Metivier	25 October 2018
Dev asks Mia to be included in the escape plan and informs her that he is able to fix the hole in the boat. Alex then confers with Petal and asks her to join the boat escape. While heading to the boat, Amber interrupts their escape and attempts to manipulate Petal into joining her. She refuses and has her mind wiped by Amber, who collapses after pushing too hard on Petal. While unconscious, her nightmares are projected around the camp, which include memories of Mia and Dev, as well as Midge.
12	12	"Run, Mia, Run"	Dan Berlinka	Dan Berlinka	25 October 2018
In order to get Luka's boat off the island, Harry plans to get a battery from the lab to power the boat. They visit the lab, where they find Mags. Mags reveals to the group that she is a doctor who operated on Midge after her injuries the previous summer and that she kept her alive through Amber. She explains that she has been overseeing Amber throughout the summer and that she plans to stay on the island, but encourages the others to leave. Amber later finds Mags and manipulates her into saying where Mia and the group are, so that she can control their mind. They barely escape, and as they make it to the boat, they find Luka has set sail without them.
13	13	"The Last Dove"	Dan Berlinka	Dan Berlinka & Nina Metivier	25 October 2018
The group are forced back to the camp, and while Dev is talking to Mia, she steals a tool from his pocket. They later escape, Mia finds Mags shaking in a corner of the lab. They ask her for help and Mags gives them an injection strong enough to kill Amber. As Alex goes to inject her, Amber takes control of their mind and forces them to target Mia alongside the other campmates. Amber tries to make Mia jump from the cliffside, but Mia stands up to her, which breaks her powers and removes Midge from her. The campmates are released from her power and as they are standing up, Midge appears from the side of the cliff.

=== Series 2 (2021) ===
No. overall	No. in series	Title	Directed by	Written by	Original release date
14	1	"A Second Chance"	Neil J. Wilkinson	Dan Berlinka & Nina Metivier	25 June 2021
Alex, Jenna, Kayleigh, Zac and Luka are in quarantine in an institution on Peregrine Island. Jenna and Alex attempt to escape; Jenna succeeds, while Alex is taken back into the institution. Despite her therapist Dr. Shaw trying to convince Mia that the events on Peregrine Island were caused by mental illness, she does not believe them. She has a stash of newspaper clippings that prove the events happened, and meets with Dave who tells her to save the others from the institution. Amber approaches Dev for help in return for telling him where Mia is, but he refuses. He is later found by the institution and taken in. Dr. Shaw is also seen to be treating Midge.
15	2	"You Don't Remember Me"	Neil J. Wilkinson	Dan Berlinka	25 June 2021
Mia, Petal and Harry venture to Peregrine Island alongside environmental activist Fitz, who plans to visit the island due to toxic waste. They find Jenna there, who agrees to tag along with the plan to find the institution. Amber finds Mia and Petal and tells them that she can lead them to the institution as long as they get her something from inside. Dr. Shaw notices Midge and Dev talking through the vents in their isolated cells and learns that it helps Midge's process. She decides to integrate Midge with the group, but she instantly becomes an outcast again. She visits the swimming pool and begins using mind powers to start a fire on Peregrine Island. She becomes surrounded by flowers, overwhelming her.
16	3	"Two Birds, One Stone"	Neil J. Wilkinson	Nina Metivier	25 June 2021
Dr. Shaw finds Midge in the swimming pool past her bedtime and it is revealed that she is Midge's mother. When Mia, Amber and Petal reach the institute, Amber changes the deal they agreed on. She states that if Mia does not allow Amber into the institute, she will break Petal's mind again. While inside, Mia finds Dev in isolation and promises to get him out. In the control room, Mia reunites with Alex and the pair place knockout gas through the air vents. However, Midge and Amber are not knocked out and confront each other. Amber tries to control Midge, who in response, turns Amber into stone.
17	4	"We Were Never Friends"	Neil J. Wilkinson	Dan Berlinka & Nina Metivier	25 June 2021
Jenna and Fitz search for Harry after they realise he is missing. They go to the institution, but are unsuccessful in finding him. Mia allows Midge to think that she is saving her alongside her friends and tells her to pack a bag and wait for them. Midge reveals to Mia that they were best friends in their childhood and that Amber wiped all memory of her. She also reveals that at their original Peregrine Island stay, Mia pretended that she did not know Midge and purposely did not include her with the group. Mia tells the others over a walkie-talkie that she plans to ditch Midge and save them, which Midge overhears. She confronts Mia and forces her into leaving without her friends.
18	5	"We Deserve Each Other"	Dan Berlinka	Dan Berlinka & Nina Metivier	25 June 2021
Midge tells the group that Mia has decided to leave them, which Dev questions. Midge does not like his questioning ways and teleports him to the woods. Alex, Petal and Kayleigh decide to explore the institution, where they find Dr. Shaw's office. On a number of USB flash drives, they find video tapes of Amber undergoing therapy with Dr. Shaw, one of which reveals that Amber is her daughter and Midge's sister. Whilst travelling through the woods, Mia finds and helps Luka, and after the pair get close, they kiss. Midge gets close to islander Sam, who also share a kiss.
19	6	"Because of Who I Am"	Dan Berlinka	Dan Berlinka	25 June 2021
Iris, a visitor on Peregrine Island, comes across Amber and talks to her about her grief for her brother, who unbeknownst to Amber is Sam. Amber offers to take her pain away via mind control, but Iris says that she needs the pain to be happy, which resonates with Amber. When the group are set to leave the island, Jenna rushes back to the dorms for Harry's research. Dr. Shaw catches her and injects her to unconsciousness. Mia goes to visit Midge to warn her of Amber, but finds the pair of them together waiting for her.
20	7	"Save Them"	Dan Berlinka	Nina Metivier	25 June 2021
Jenna breaks free from Dr. Shaw and locks her in the room of the basement. Midge tells Mia that she wants to take over her body and that she has cancelled the evacuation for the others. Amber goes to help them as she wants to escape from Midge too. While hiding from Midge, Mia finds Dr. Shaw and confronts her for gaslighting her and asks about Midge. Dr. Shaw tells her that Midge is past saving. Sam tells Midge that the pair of them are dead and that they should fade away, but she refuses. In order to stay alive, Midge begins stealing life from everyone on the island.
21	8	"Who We Really Are."	Dan Berlinka	Dan Berlinka & Nina Metivier	25 June 2021
Mia awakens in Midge's mind, where she sees a crystal matching the colour of her eyes. After Amber rescues her, she informs Mia that if the crystal is destroyed, Midge's powers will be taken. Amber helps them to destroy the crystal just as Midge is confronting Mia. Alex and Petal kiss when they are reunited. Six weeks later, the group are enjoying living their lives normally. The crystal on the island then lights up again.
