= Ryūya =

- Gender: Male

Origin
- Origin: Japanese
- Meaning: Different meanings depending on the kanji used

Ryūya, Ryuya or Ryuuya (written: 竜也, 龍也, 龍矢, 隆矢 or 柳也) is a masculine Japanese given name. Notable people with the name include:

- Ryuya Matsumoto (松本 竜也; born 1993), Japanese baseball player
- Ryuya Nishio (西尾 隆矢; born 2001), Japanese footballer
- Ryuya Ogawa (小川 龍也; born 1991), Japanese baseball player
- Ryuya Wakaba (若葉 竜也; born 1989), Japanese actor
- Ryuya Yamanaka (山中 竜也; born 1995), Japanese boxer

== Fictional characters ==
- Ryūya (柳也), a character in the visual novel Air
- Captain Ryuya Asami, the overarching antagonist in the 24th season of Super Sentai, Mirai Sentai Timeranger
