= Triumph Dolomite (1934–1940) =

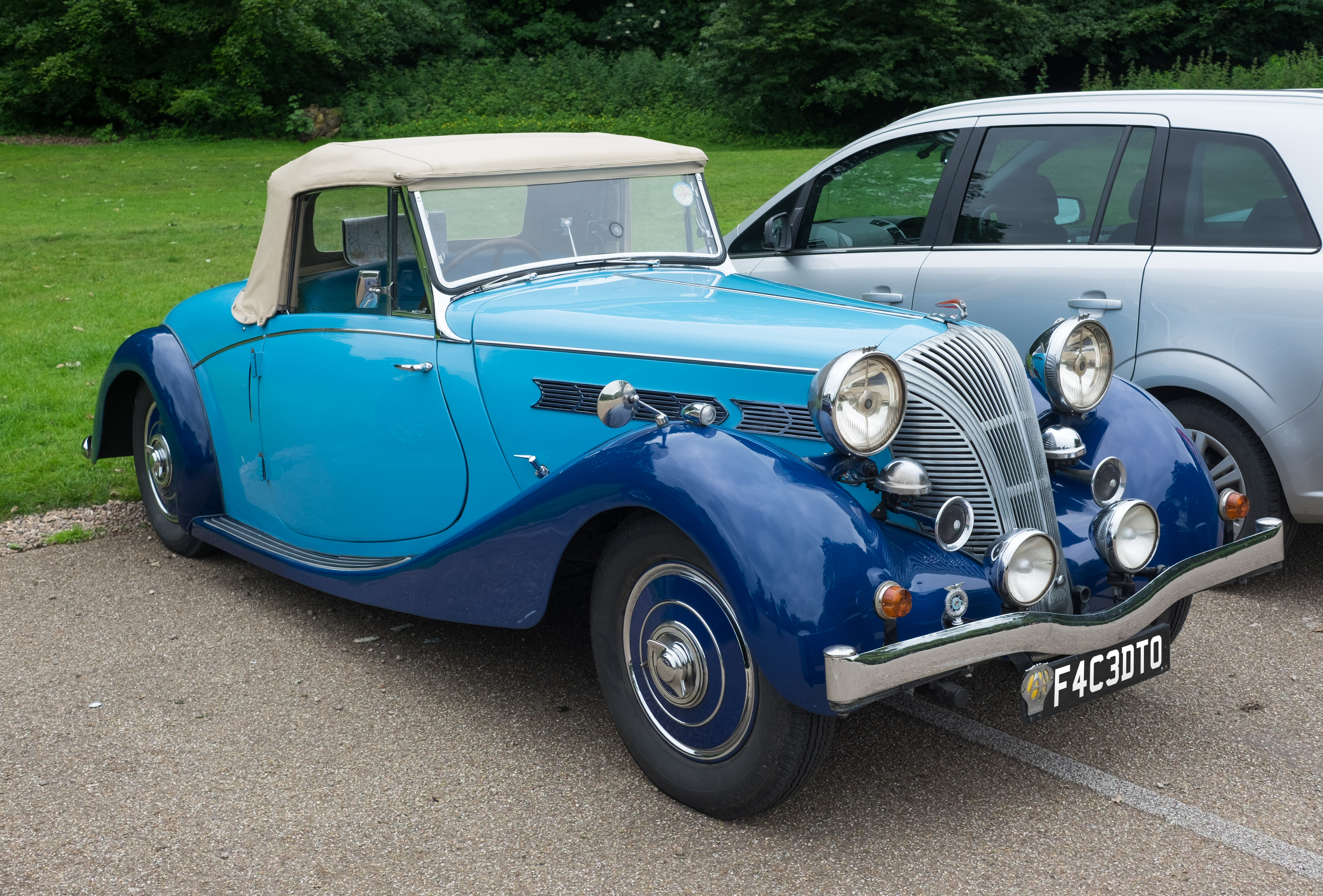
- Dolomite roadster coupé 1940

Overview
- Manufacturer: Triumph Motor Company
- Production: 1934–1940

The Triumph Dolomite is a car that was produced by Triumph Motor Company from 1934 to 1940. It first appeared in 1934 as a sports car and the name was also used from 1937 on a series of sporting saloons and open cars until 1939 when the company went into receivership. A number were still sold and registered in 1940, though it is uncertain whether the receiver or new owner turned out cars from spare parts, or sold off completed cars. All except the Straight 8 featured a "waterfall" grille styled by Walter Belgrove, versions of the saloons with conventional grilles were sold as Continental models.

== Dolomite Straight 8 ==
Triumph Dolomite 8
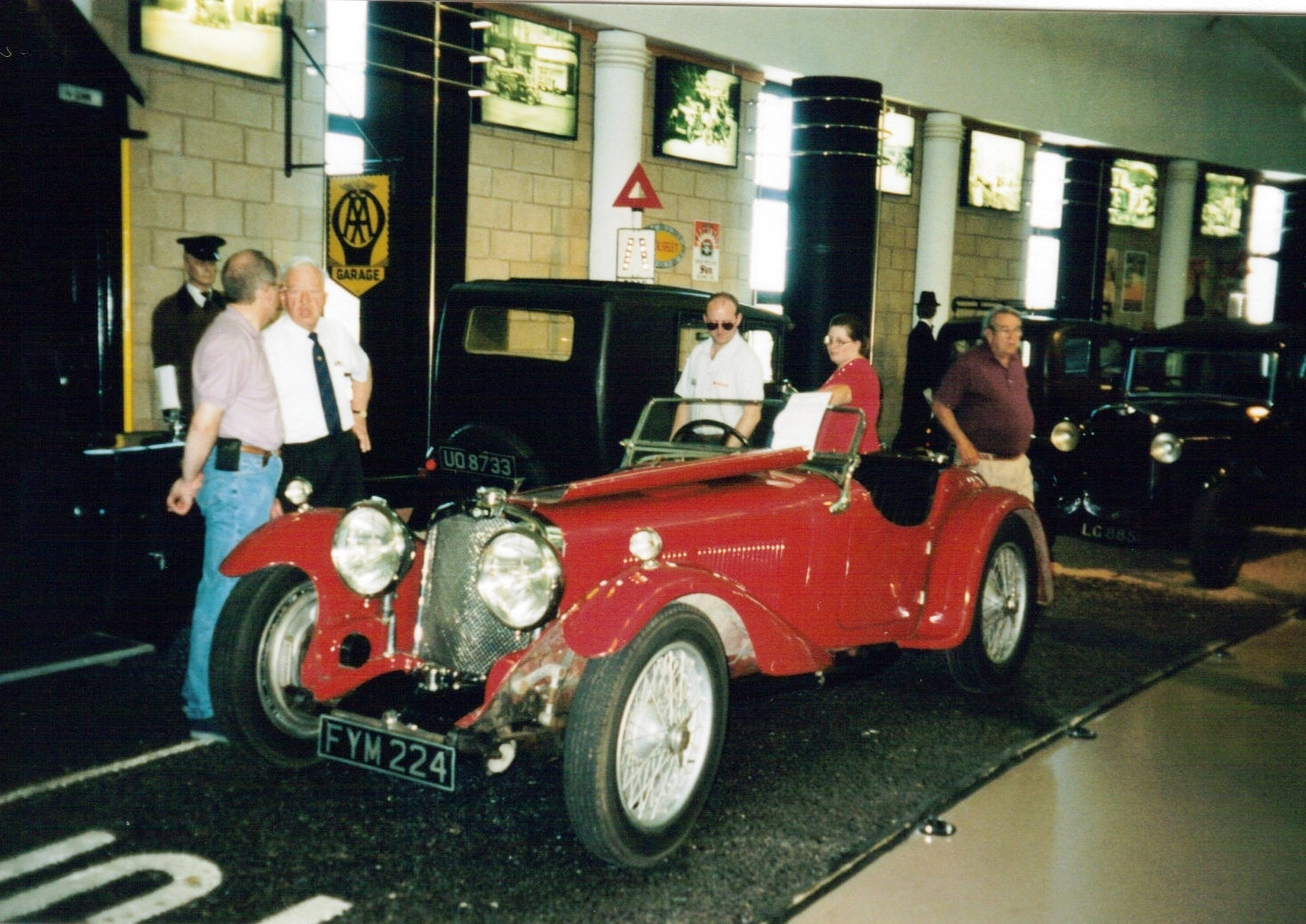

Overview
- Manufacturer: Triumph Motor Company
- Production: 1934–1935; 3 made

Body and chassis
- Body style: open two-seater sports-racing car

Powertrain
- Engine: 1991 cc straight-8
- Transmission: 4-speed preselector

Dimensions
- Wheelbase: 104 in (2,642 mm)

The first use of the "Dolomite" name was in 1934, when it was used for an eight-cylinder sports car which resembled the Alfa Romeo 8C. However this car did not make production, with only three being made. The engine was of 1,990 cc capacity with twin overhead camshafts and fitted with a Roots-type supercharger. The engine output was 140 bhp (100 kW) at 5,500 rpm, giving the car a top speed of over 110 mph (180 km/h) when tested at Brooklands. Lockheed hydraulic brakes with large 16 in (410 mm) elektron drums were fitted. The channel-section pressed steel chassis was conventional with a beam front axle and half-elliptic springs all round.

One of the cars was entered in the 1935 Monte Carlo Rally driven by Donald Healey but was withdrawn after being written off in a collision with a railway train on a level crossing in Denmark.

Largely because of the financial troubles of the company, the car never went into production. Some spare engines and chassis were later assembled into complete cars by a London company called High Speed Motors (HSM).

A car as described above was displayed on Stand 135 at the Olympia Motor Show in October 1934 equipped with an Armstrong Siddeley-Wilson preselective gearbox. The wheelbase was eight feet eight inches and track was four feet six inches. It was priced at 1,000 guineas (£1,050). A new small Ford was available for £100.

== Dolomite sports saloons and coupés ==
Triumph Dolomite
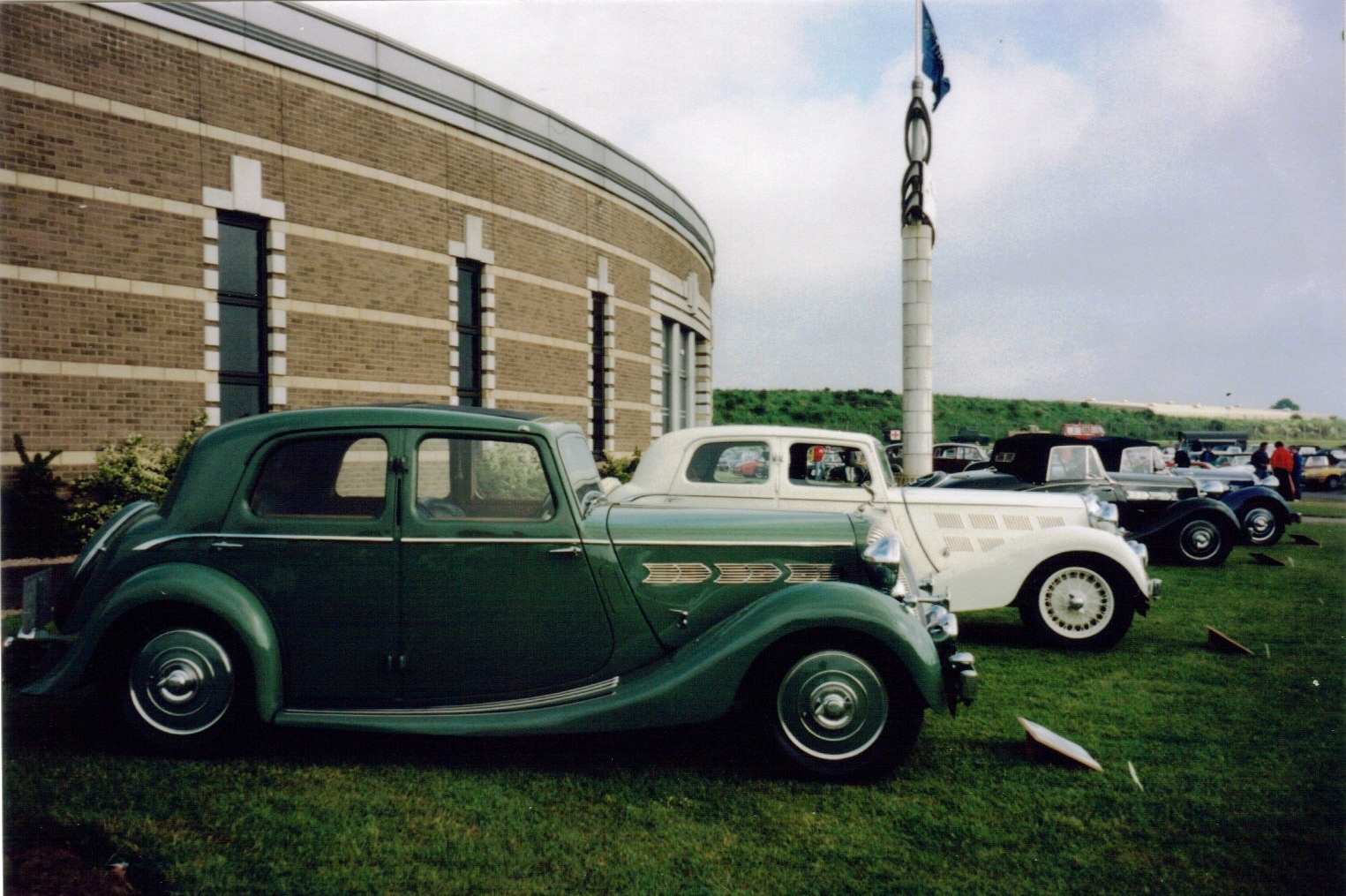
- Dolomites on parade at Gaydon museum

Overview
- Manufacturer: Triumph Motor Company
- Production: 1937–1940

Body and chassis
- Body style: 4-door sports saloon 4-seater Foursome drophead coupé Roadster (drophead coupé with dickey seat)
- Layout: front engine rear-wheel drive
- Platform: separate chassis frame is cruciform and underslung

Powertrain
- Engine: 1767 cc In-line 4 —14/60, 14/65; 1991 cc In-line 6 —16, 2-litre 1496 cc In-line 4 —1½-litre
- Transmission: mounted at four points as a unit with the engine: single dry-plate air-cooled clutch and 4-speed gearbox with synchromesh except on 1st, the power carried by needle roller bearing open propeller shaft to the helical bevel half-floating rear axle

Dimensions
- Wheelbase: 2,794 mm (110 in) track 52½ inches
- Length: 4,496 mm (177 in)
- Width: 1,702 mm (67 in)
- Height: depends on body
- Kerb weight: 1,245 kg (2,744 lb) 24½ cwt

=== 14/60 ===
The Dolomite name was again used from 1937 to 1940. The car this time had a 1,767 cc four-cylinder engine and saloon body. The design was overseen by Donald Healey and featured a striking new design of radiator grille by Walter Belgrove. The cars were marketed as "the finest in all the land" and targeted directly at the luxury sporting saloon market.

Triumph had been moving progressively upmarket during the 1930s, and the 1938 Dolomites were very well equipped, with winding windows in the doors, automatic chassis lubrication, a leather-bound steering wheel adjustable for rake and reach, dual hydraulic brake circuits, twin trumpet horns, and spot lamps included in the price. There was even a tray of fitted tools slotted beneath the driver's seat cushion, and for an extra 18 guineas buyers could specify a radio.

The body was aluminium over a rot-proofed ash frame. Like many Triumphs of that time, the car followed the American trend of concealing its radiator behind a flamboyant shining metal grille. The British market, then as now, was in many ways a conservative one, however, and, before Dolomite production was suspended completely, Triumph had time to introduce a "Vitesse"-branded version of the Dolomite on which the grille had been removed and the car's own radiator was exposed in the traditional manner.

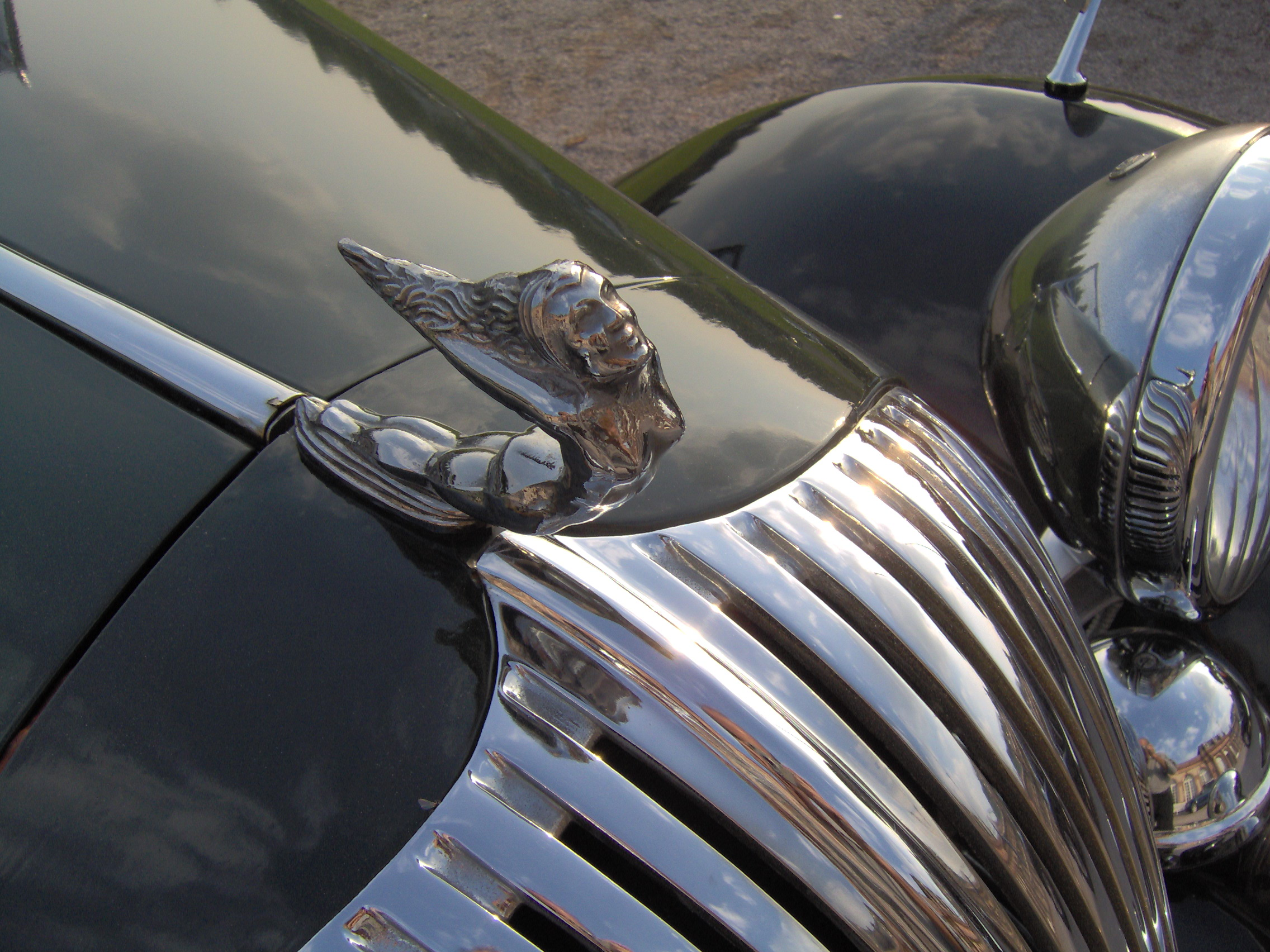

=== Road test ===
A 14/60 four-door four-light saloon was road tested by The Times. Head clearance was described as moderate but it was felt there was good width and leg room for two persons in the back seat and the doorways gave "reasonable entrance". Interior fittings included three electric lights, two-way visors, a sliding roof, three ashtrays, an instrument board with large dial clock and speedometer, a telescopic spring steering wheel, wholly automatic chassis lubrication, a jacking system and a windscreen which could be wound out to give a direct view.

At the front the equipment included a stabilizing bumper, two wind horns, two fog lights, two large headlamps and small side lamps on the wings. It was particularly noted that the modernistic front to the radiator was a die casting and not a tinny assembly.

Testers described driving the car as giving the impression of a fine feel of control and with an engine to match that. Smooth enough to be thought of as a six the engine had "high mettle" and did not mind being called upon for speed affording almost "sportslike" pickup. The gearchange was considered "a delight" with a well located small remote control lever and excellent synchromesh. Steering was not too heavy. The driver was given a good view ahead and behind though the view through the back windows was rather small.

The steering and suspension were rated as "adequate", back passengers they said "travel with comfort", top speed was found to be about 75 miles an hour.
Price as tested was £348.

14 / 60

Layout
- Configuration: inline 4
- Displacement: 1767cc
- Cylinder bore: 75mm
- Piston stroke: 100mm
- Cylinder block material: crankshaft on 3 main bearings
- Valvetrain: pushrod operated overhead valves

Combustion
- Fuel system: twin horizontal carburetters with common air silencer, electric petrol pump
- Fuel type: petrol
- Cooling system: water with thermostatic control

Output
- Power output: 62 bhp at 4,500rpm RAC or tax rating13.95 hp

=== 14/65 ===
In April 1938 an increased compression ratio and mild further engine tuning justified a changed designation from 14/60 to 14/65 (where 14 was the fiscal horsepower and 65 was the claimed actual horsepower).

=== Roadster coupé ===
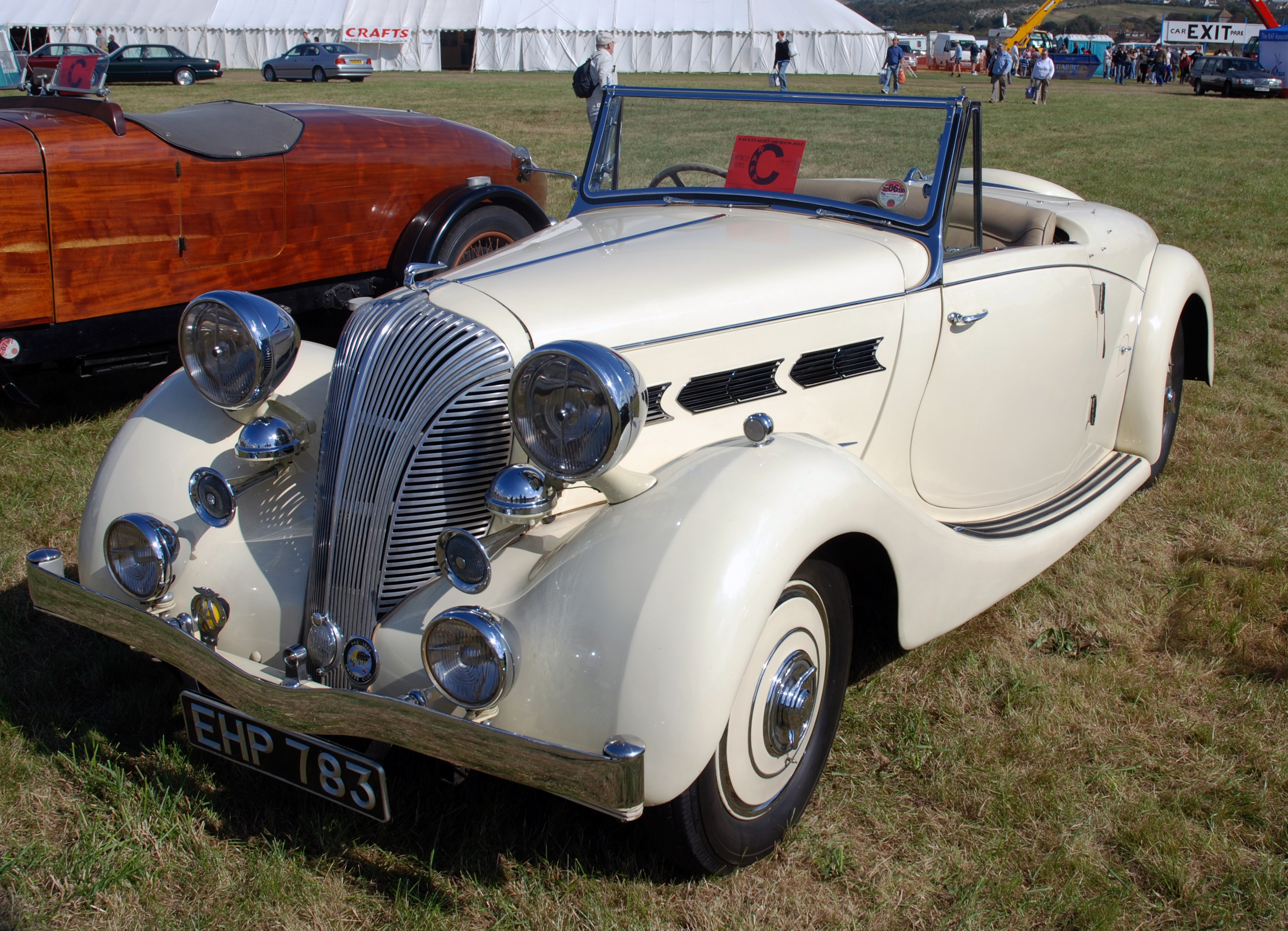
Roadster drophead coupé s.w.b. with dickey seat

This is an open version of the 14/65, announced 29 March 1938, with seating for three people on a single bench seat and "two additional outside seats in the tail, reminiscent of the dickey seat that was at one time common" for two more people behind. The hood folded completely into the body to give the appearance of an open sports car. The car was announced with the 1,767 cc (107.8 cu in) engine with twin SU carburettors. A two-tone (coffee and cream) version of this model featured in the 1945 film version of Noël Coward's Blithe Spirit, directed by David Lean. It was driven by Rex Harrison.

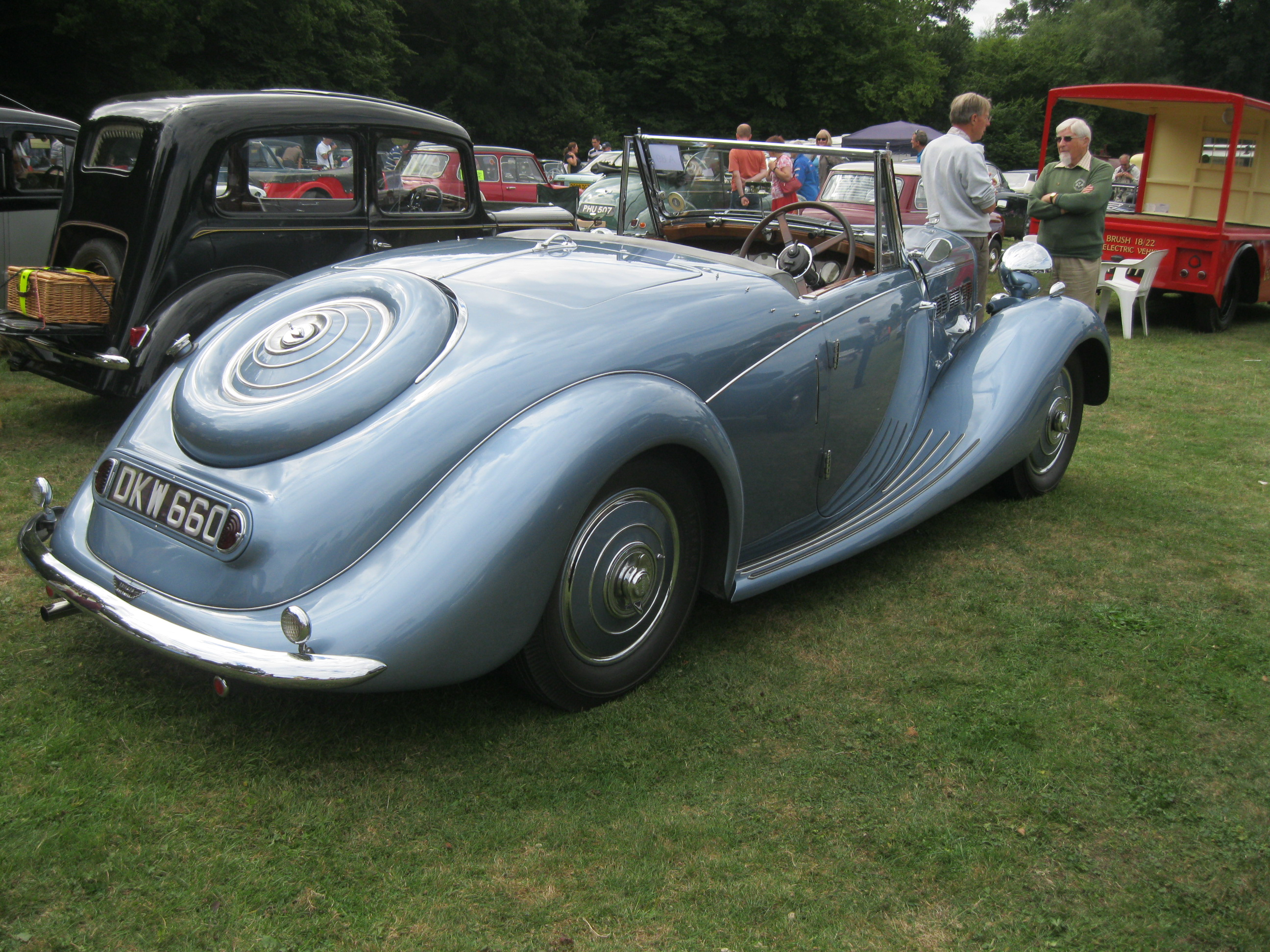
1940 1767 cc l.w.b.

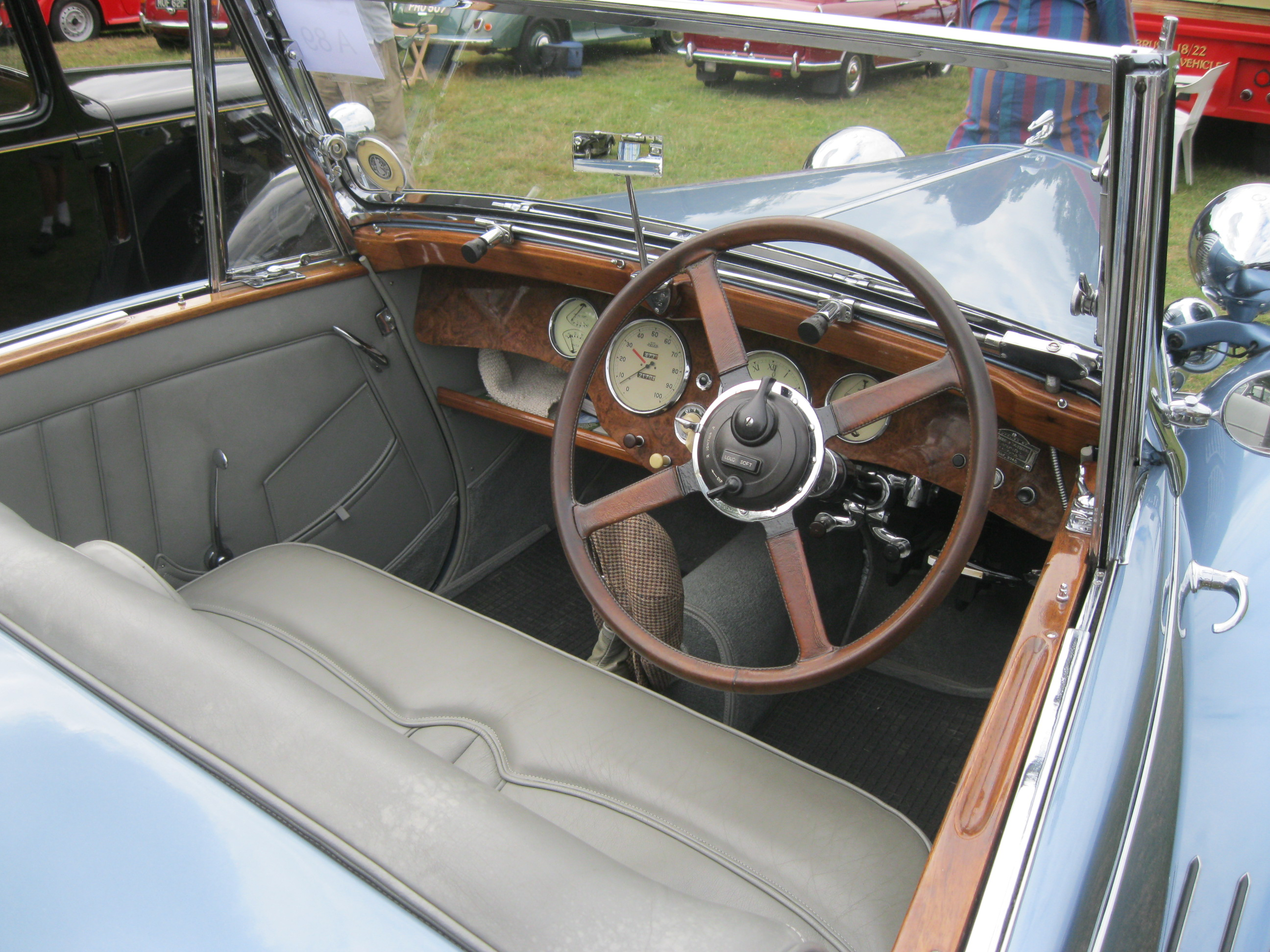

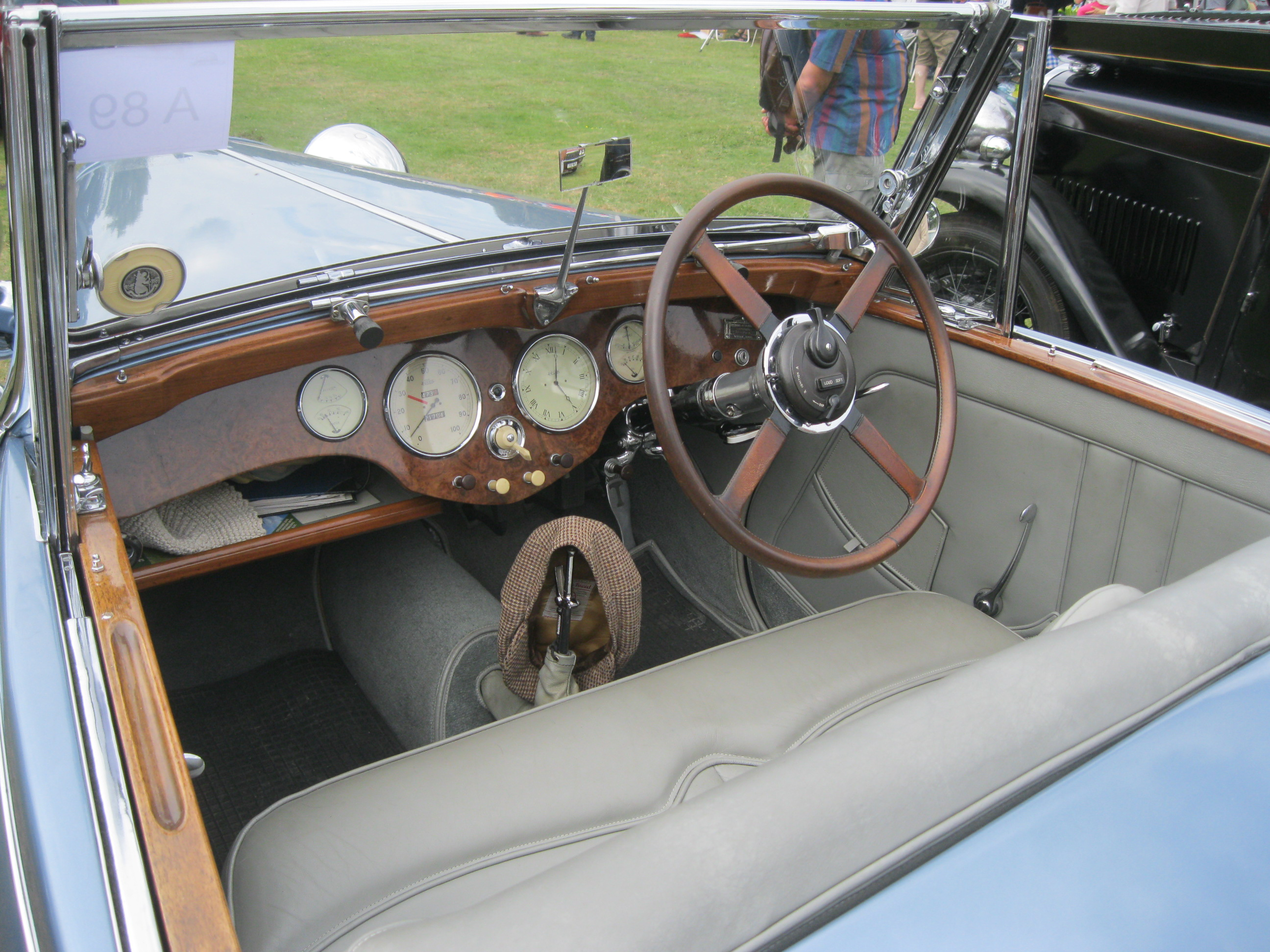

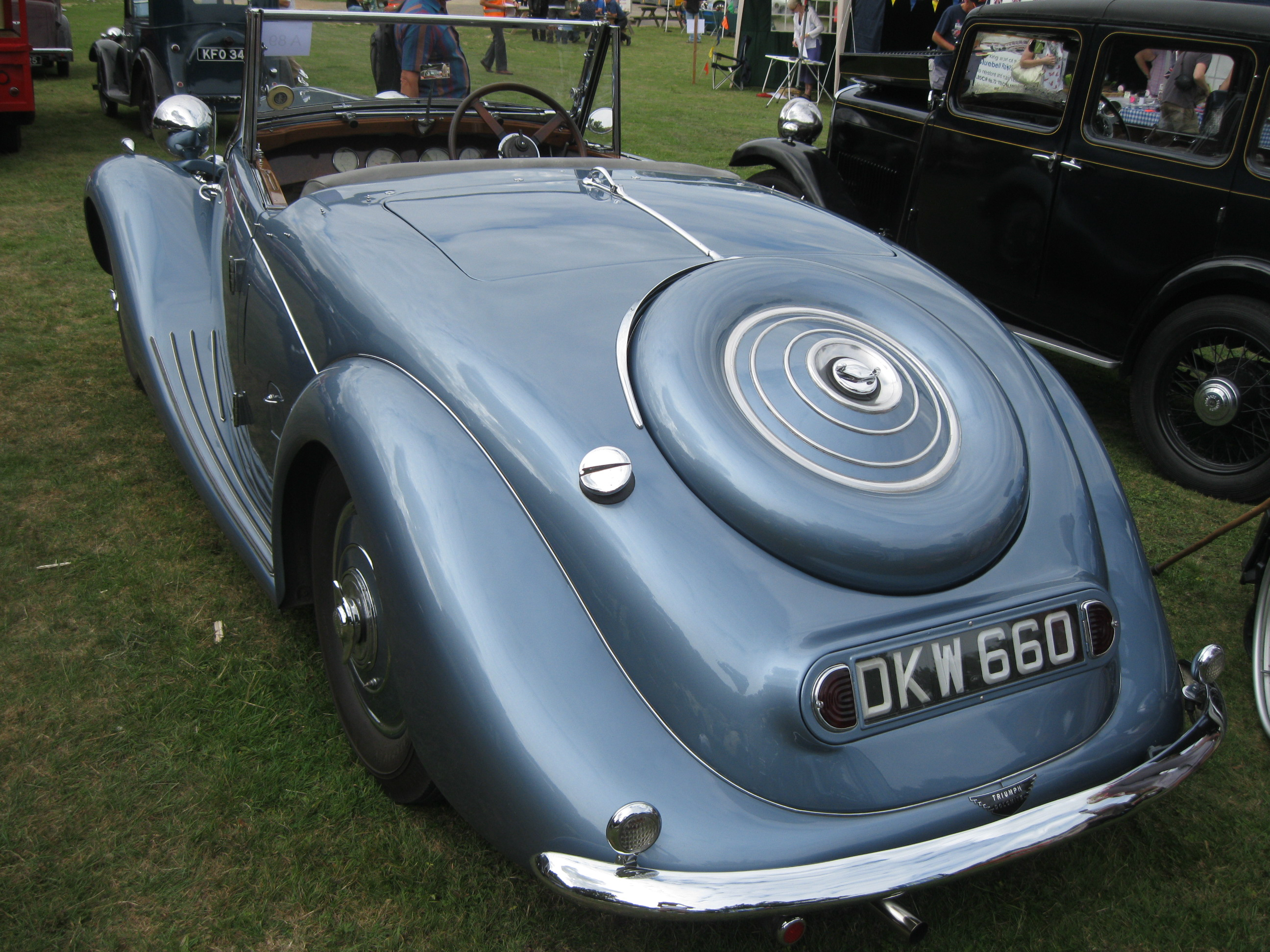

=== 16 two-litre six-cylinder engine ===
In July 1938 a slightly longer wheelbase version powered by a 1,991 cc (121.5 cu in) engine fed by triple SUs joined the range while the saloon version featuring the same 1,991 cc engine still made do with just two SU carburettors. No power output figure was quoted by the manufacturers for the 1,991 cc Dolomite.

The cars received excellent reviews from the period motoring press.

2-litre Foursome drophead coupé, sports saloon and roadster drophead coupé

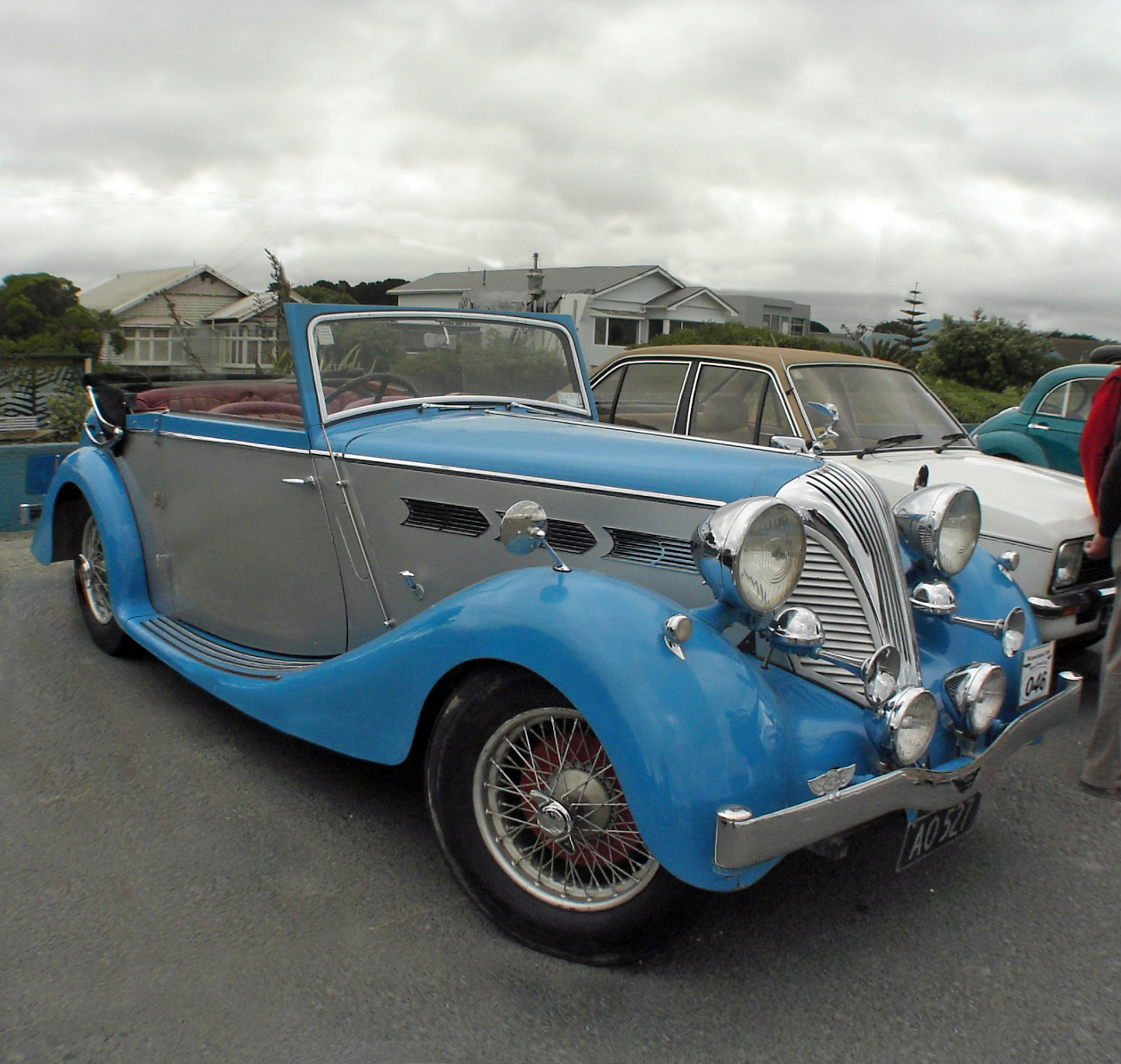

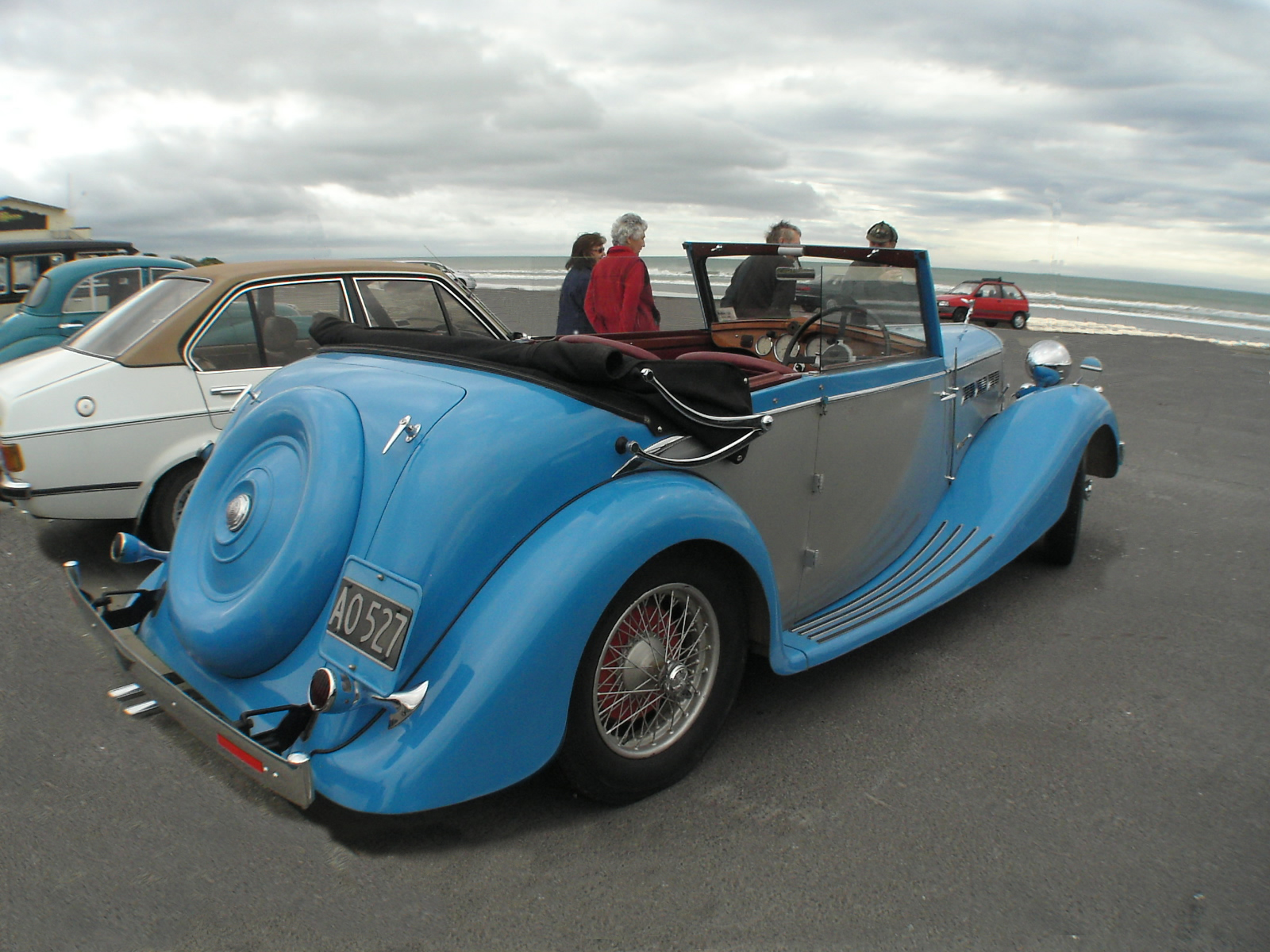

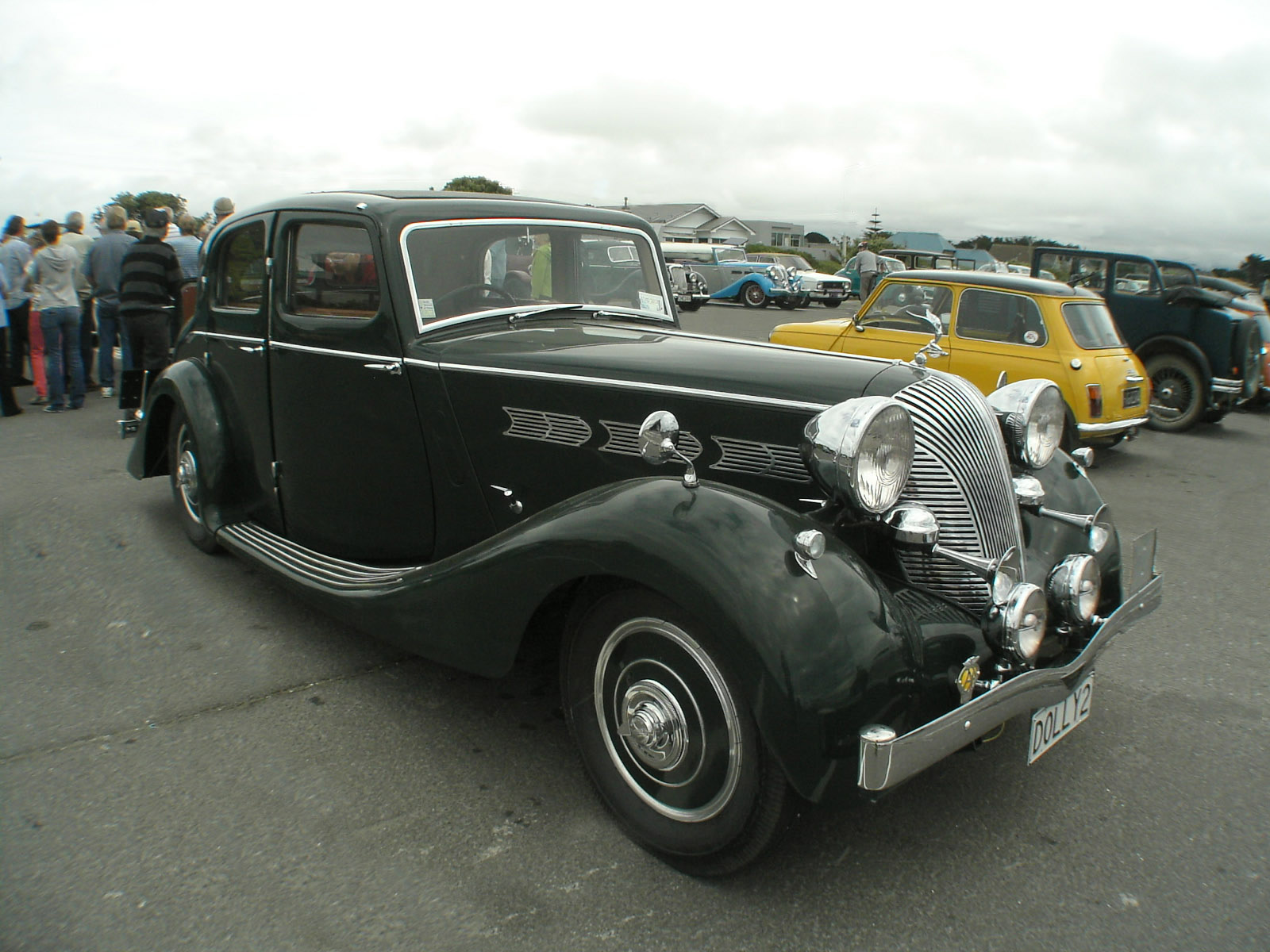

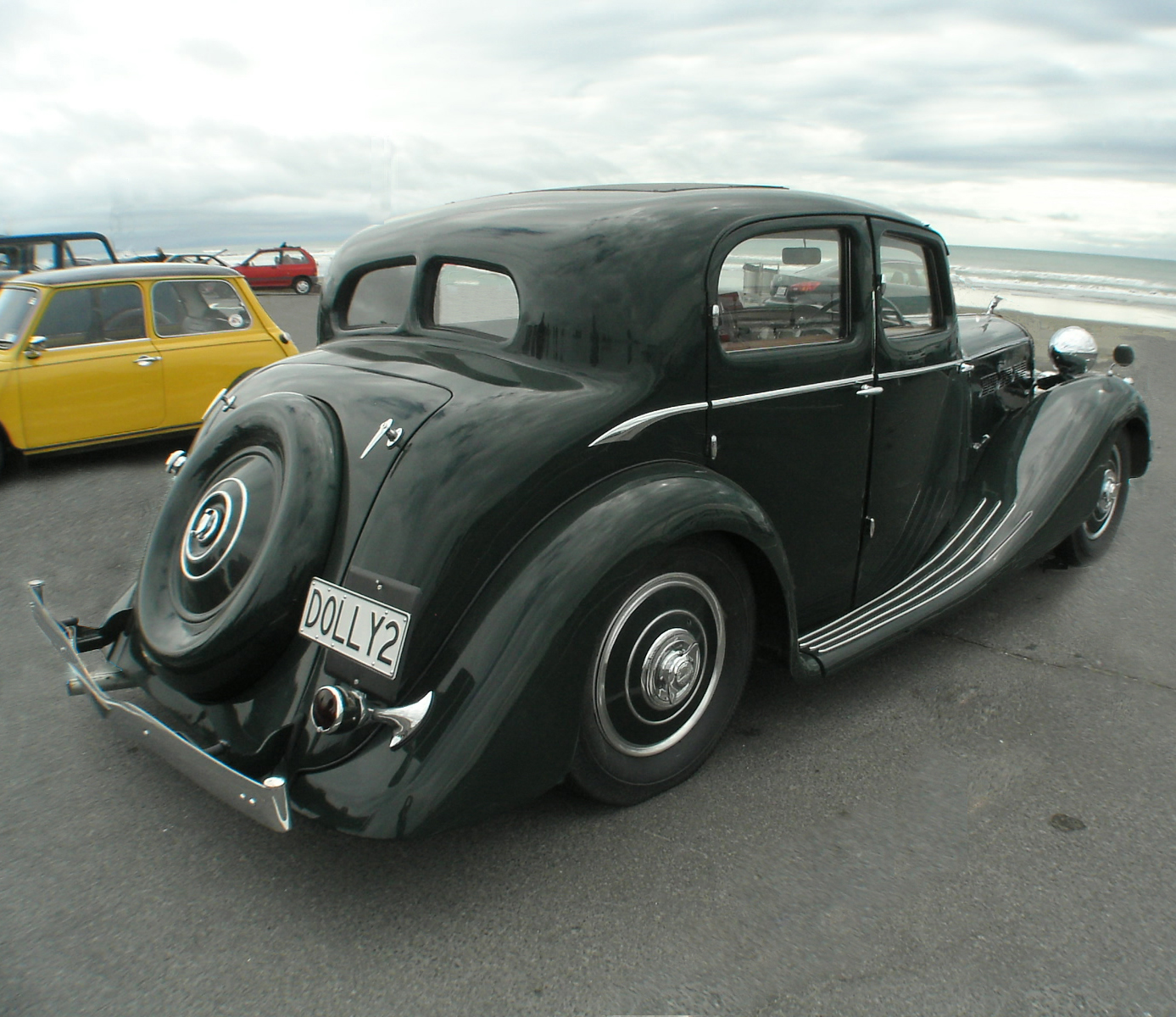

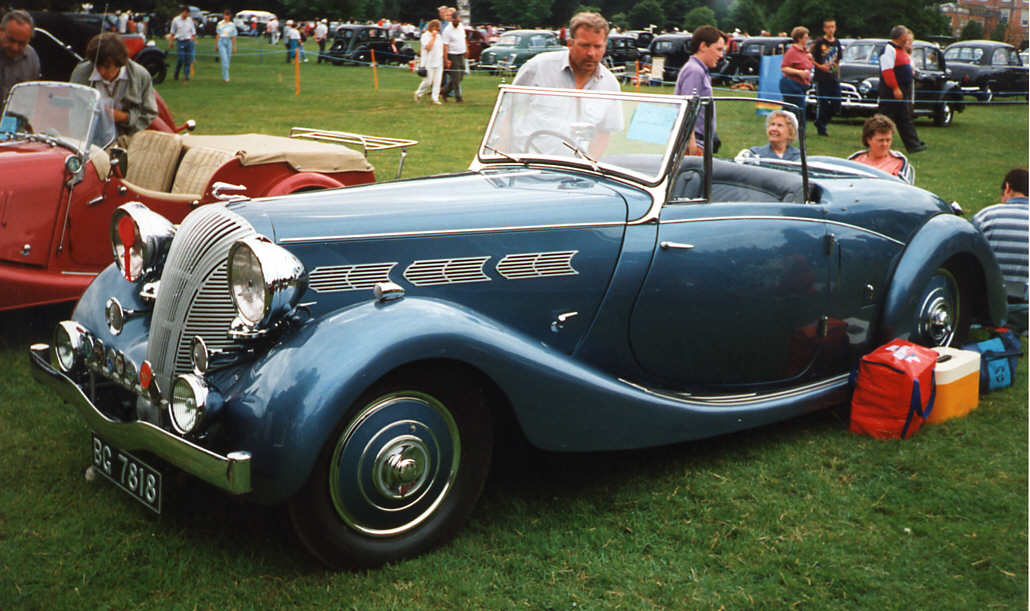

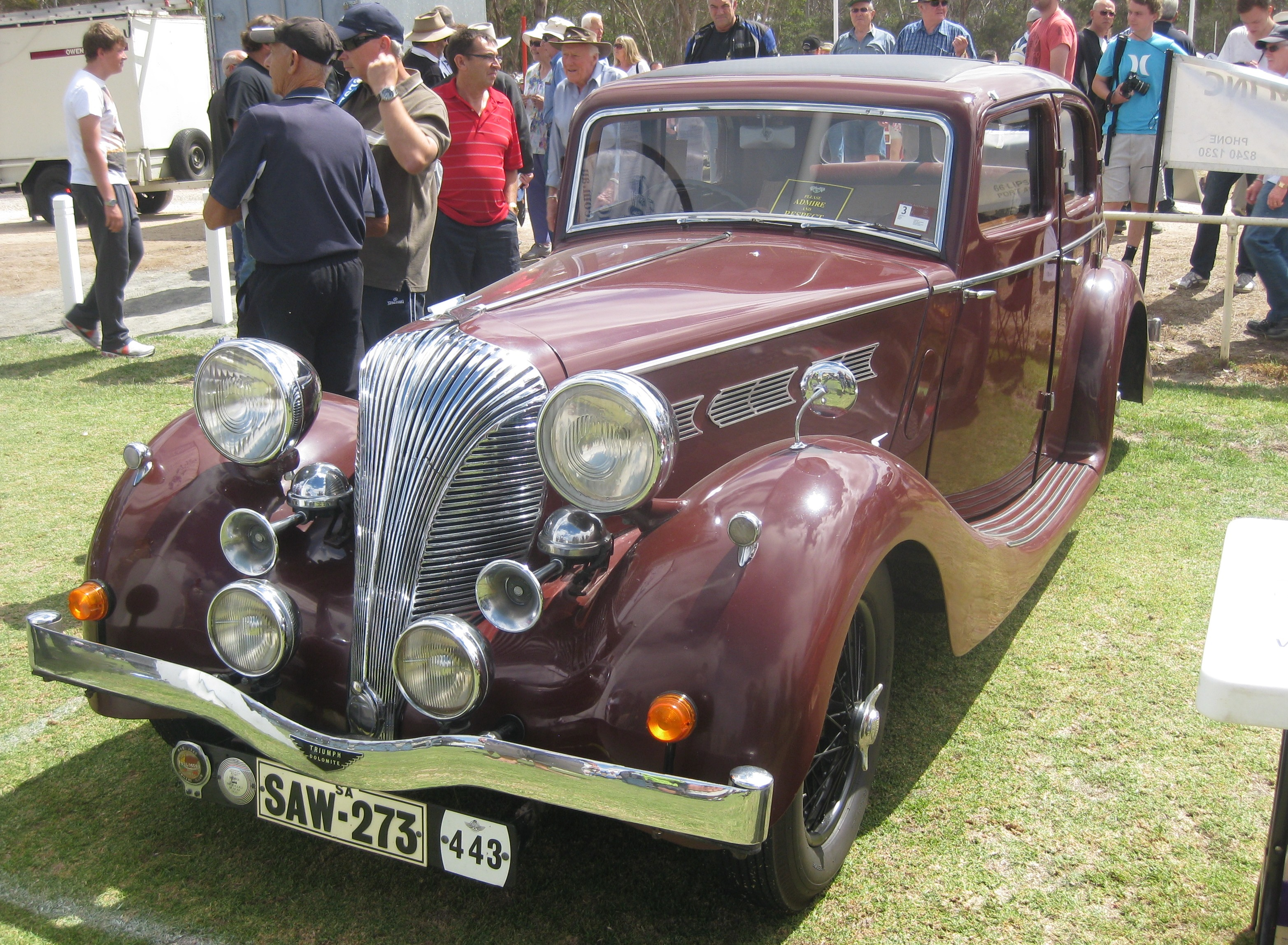

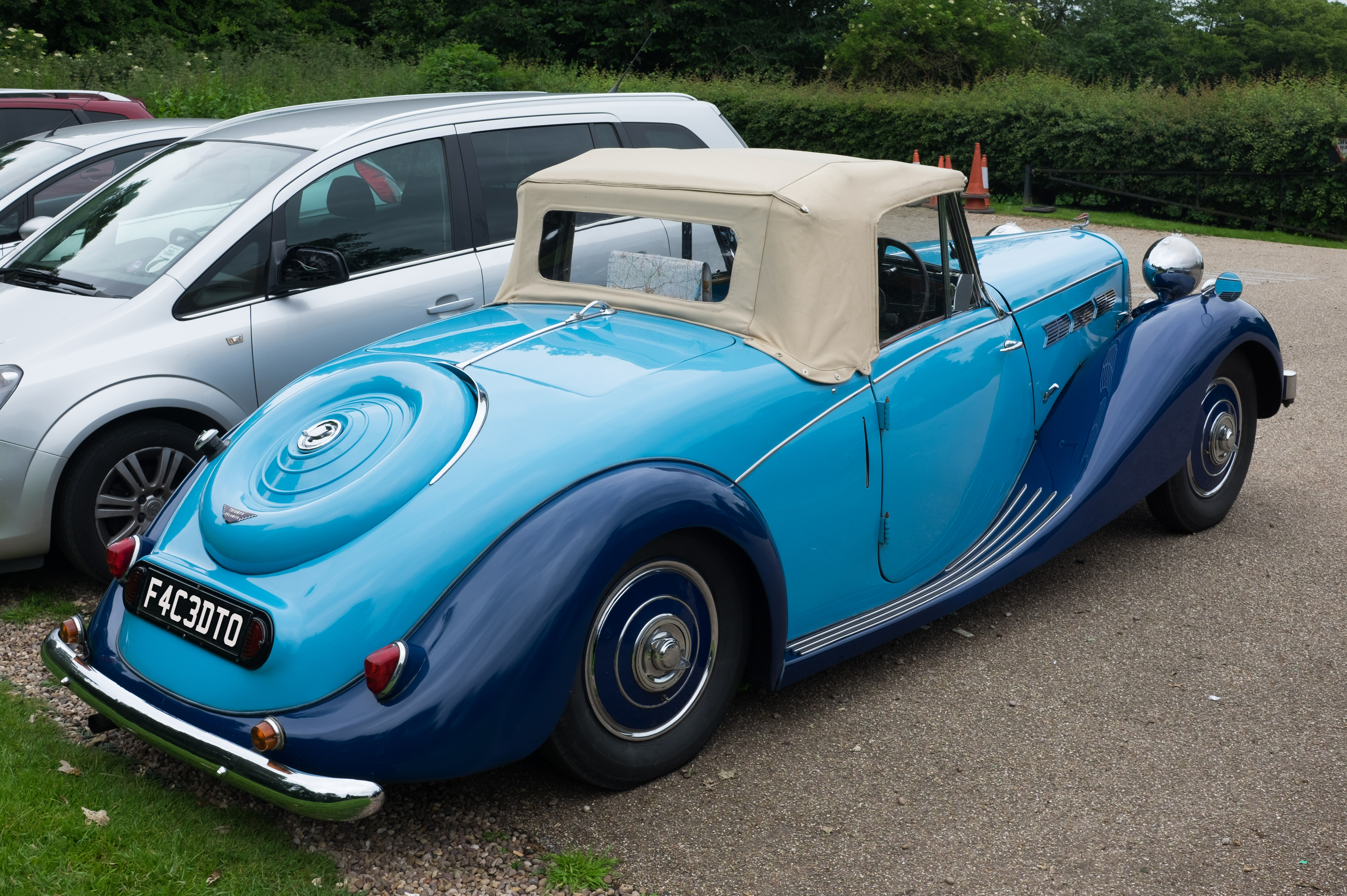

In 1939, less than a month after Britain declared war on Germany, and before civilian automobile availability had been withdrawn by government in either country, the Autocar magazine featured a road test of the two-litre Dolomite Roadster coupe. By this time the manufacturer's published price had risen to £495. The testers recorded a mean maximum speed of 78 mph (126 km/h), with a best timed maximum speed of 81 mph (130 km/h)). Acceleration from rest to 50 mph (80 km/h) was timed at 15 seconds. The testers appear to have been impressed by everything except the ambient weather.

=== 1 1/2-litre ===
In 1938 a smaller-engined version with a 1,496 cc engine was announced and available as a saloon or tourer. The 1,767 cc engine was an option at first but became standard in 1939. A coupé was shown, but never went into production.

== WWII ==
The experience of producing hand beaten aluminium panels made the Coventry plant where the Dolomite was built a natural candidate for aircraft production as this was ramped up. This also attracted attention from the Luftwaffe, and the plant fell victim to bombing in 1940.
