= The Judas Contract =

Comic book storyline

- Cover of Tales of the Teen Titans Annual #3 (July 1984). Art by George Pérez.
- Publisher: DC Comics
- Publication date: May – July 1984
- Main character(s): Teen Titans; Deathstroke; Terra; Jericho

Creative team
- Writer: Marv Wolfman
- Artist: Adrienne Roy
- Penciller: George Pérez
- Inker: Dick Giordano
- Letterer: John Costanza
- Colorist: George Pérez
- Editor(s): Marv Wolfman; George Pérez

"The Judas Contract" is a Teen Titans event featuring the secret origins of Deathstroke in the DC Comics. The story revolves around the betrayal of Terra after her revelation as a secret agent. "The Judas Contract" is also noted for the introduction of Deathstroke's ex-wife, Adeline, but more importantly, it introduces his second son Joey Wilson. Immediately following the events of "The Judas Contract", Joey joins the Teen Titans as Jericho. Adeline Kane remains a stable supporting character and has made frequent appearances in both New Teen Titans and Teen Titans Spotlight. In addition, this storyline presents the first appearance of Dick Grayson under his new costume and code-name Nightwing, having left the Robin identity behind.

== Plot ==
"The Judas Contract" begins shortly after Dick Grayson and Wally West officially retire from active service. Though no longer calling himself Robin, Dick is still intrinsically involved in Titans activity. The group's most recent protégé Terra Markov, is not a full-fledged Titan, but has won the heart and mind of Beast Boy. None of the Titans suspect that she has been secretly spying on them on behalf of her partner Deathstroke. Terra has been feeding Deathstroke important information regarding the Titans, including their secret identities. During a training exercise, the Titans begin to learn how mentally unstable Terra truly is. After enduring numerous playful barbs from Beast Boy, she unleashes a massive attack that nearly cripples him. The other Titans calm her down, but it is Raven who realizes that there is something seriously dangerous about Terra.

Once Terra acquires all of the information she needs, she informs Deathstroke, who systematically takes down each of the Titans. He first strikes at the apartment penthouse shared by Donna Troy and Starfire. He incapacitates Starfire with a high-yield letter bomb, and renders Donna unconscious with a gas mixture that he adds to her darkroom chemicals. He then takes out Cyborg by electrifying a chair in his apartment. The high voltage shorts out Cyborg's systems long enough for Deathstroke to collect him. He then tries to take down Dick at his apartment, but is surprised when the one non-powered Titan manages to elude him. Frustrated, he goes to the Hamptons to take down Beast Boy. Boy licks a stack of envelope seals treated with a special poison that renders him unconscious. With all but one of the Titans captured, he brings them to the Rocky Mountain headquarters of his employers, H.I.V.E. Deathstroke is satisfied that he has completed the contract left behind by his late son Grant, but H.I.V.E. criticizes him for failing to bring them Robin.

Meanwhile, Dick, having discovered that all of his former teammates have been captured returns to Titans Tower. There he is greeted by Adeline Kane, Deathstroke's ex-wife. She introduces him to her son Joey. Adeline tells Dick that Terra is a traitor to the team and has been secretly working with her husband since the Titans first met her. Dick is incredulous at first, but slowly believes Adeline's story after she provides him a comprehensive history on Slade Wilson and the means by which he became Deathstroke. Adeline reveals to Dick that Joey was kidnapped at a young age by Jackal and had his throat slit, leaving him mute. Enraged, Adeline attacked Slade, but only managed to shoot out his right eye. Dick, realizing that he can never truly retire, adopts the identity of Nightwing, with Joey accompanying him as Jericho. Before Dick and Joey depart, Adeline has Joey demonstrate his power of possession on Dick, taking control of his body before relinquishing it. Adeline then gives the heroes the location of the H.I.V.E. command center.

Nightwing and Jericho go the H.I.V.E. base nestled in the Rocky Mountains. They sneak into the facility and discover that the Titans have been strapped to a giant machine which is slowly siphoning away their life energy. Nightwing and Jericho fight through a horde of H.I.V.E. shock troops but are eventually captured. Deathstroke is surprised to see his son with the Titans and tries to bargain with H.I.V.E. to let him go, but is unsuccessful. Jericho possesses Deathstroke, then frees the other Titans and begins fighting H.I.V.E. Terra is enraged at Deathstroke and feels that his affection for Joey makes him weak. In a rage, Terra causes the H.I.V.E. facility to collapse, killing herself in the process. The Titans bring Terra's body back to New York for burial. The funeral service is small and only the Titans and the Outsiders are in attendance. The Titans let Terra's brother, Geo-Force, believe that she died heroically while fighting H.I.V.E.

== Reception ==
"The Judas Contract" won the Comics Buyer's Guide Fan Award for "Favorite Comic Book Story" of 1984 and was later reprinted as a standalone trade paperback in 1988.

== Collected edition ==
Title	Material collected	Published date	ISBN
New Teen Titans: The Judas Contract	New Teen Titans #39-40, Tales of the Teen Titans #41-44, Tales of the Teen Titans Annual #1	August 1988	0-930289-34-X

== In other media ==
=== Television ===
- "The Judas Contact" is adapted in the second season of Teen Titans. In this version, Terra is more sympathetic and tragic and initially displays little control over her powers, the latter trait being a source of shame for her. While on the run due to her powers, she encounters the Teen Titans, during which she confides in Beast Boy her fear of losing control and he develops a crush on her, and Slade, who claims to know everything about her and offers to help her. Agreeing with Slade, she temporarily leaves the Titans to study under him before returning to serve as a double agent and dates Beast Boy until he breaks up with her when she reveals her true allegiance. She helps Slade take over Jump City and seemingly kills the Titans, but develops second thoughts. After Slade betrays her, she overcomes his control, kills him, and sacrifices herself to save Jump City, turning to stone in the process. In the final episode, Beast Boy discovers Terra disappeared and encounters a girl resembling her with no powers or recollection of what happened.
- Elements of "The Judas Contract" are adapted in the third season of Young Justice. Terra was recruited into the League of Shadows under Deathstroke and worked for them as an assassin for two years before allowing the Outsiders to rescue her and acting as a double agent within their ranks. After Artemis appeals to her better nature, Terra openly defies Deathstroke's order to kill Beast Boy and defects to the Outsiders. Unlike the original storyline, Terra survives.
- Elements of "The Judas Contract" are adapted in the second season of Titans, with Terra's role being filled by Ravanger. After seeking Deathstroke out, she was recruited by him to serve as a mole in the Titans at the cost of her left eye. She worked with and secretly helped disband the Titans, claiming she wanted revenge on Deathstroke to avenge her dead half-brother Jericho, until her mission is compromised by her budding relationship with Jason Todd, who leaves her upon learning her true intentions, and Dick Grayson revealing Deathstroke killed Jericho. Rose subsequently betrays her father and grievously injures him, unknowingly causing Jericho's spirit to leave him and possess her, before joining a new iteration of the Titans.

=== Film ===
The story of "The Judas Contract" was adapted into the DC Animated Movie Universe (DCAMU) film Teen Titans: The Judas Contract.

=== Video Games ===
Deathstroke’s suit from "The Judas Contract" appears as an alternate suit for him in Batman: Arkham Origins.
