= Rose Wilson =

DC Comics character

- Rose Wilson as the Ravager. Art by ACO.

Publication information
- Publisher: DC Comics
- First appearance: Deathstroke #15 (October 1992)
- Created by: Marv Wolfman; Art Nichols

In-story information
- Alter ego: Rose Wilson (current continuity); Rose Wilson-Worth (previous continuity)
- Species: Metahuman
- Place of origin: Cambodia
- Team affiliations: Teen Titans; Stormwatch; Defiance; N.O.W.H.E.R.E. League of Assassins; Terror Titans; Suicide Squad
- Partnerships: Deathstroke; Dick Grayson; Jason Todd; Tim Drake; Wonder Girl (Cassie Sandsmark); Jericho; Beast Boy; Raven; Superboy (Kon-El); Bart Allen
- Notable aliases: Ravager; Deathstroke
- Abilities: Enhanced strength, speed, stamina, durability, agility, reflexes, senses, and intellect; Accelerated healing; Decelerated aging; Precognition; Expert martial artist and hand-to-hand combatant; Expert markswoman and swordswoman; Power dampening, anti-psychic presence, mental link (New 52 incarnation)

Rose Wilson is a fictional character appearing in American comic books published by DC Comics. She was created by writer Marv Wolfman and artist Art Nichols, first appearing in a 1992 issue of Deathstroke the Terminator #15. She is usually portrayed as a Teen Titans enemy and later a reluctant member, struggling to win the approval of her father, Deathstroke, being his illegitimate daughter. She is also typically depicted as an apprentice to her father and later Nightwing for a time.

Rose Wilson would make several appearances in media such as Teen Titans Go!, DC Super Hero Girls, and a live adaptation debut in the second season of the DC Universe and HBO Max series Titans, played by Chelsea Zhang. Traits of the character were amalgamated into the character of Isabel Rochev/Ravager for the second season of Arrow, portrayed by Summer Glau.

== Fictional character biography ==
=== Introduction ===
Rose Wilson is the youngest of three children. Her father, Slade Wilson (Deathstroke), met brothel owner Lili Worth while helping her escape from war-torn Cambodia. After an intermittent love affair with Slade, Worth gives birth to a daughter whom she names Rose, keeping her existence secret from him. Rose learns that Slade is her father after Ravager (Wade DeFarge, Deathstroke's half-brother) captures her and tells her. Fearing for Rose's safety, Slade leaves her in the care of the Teen Titans.

==== New Ravager ====
The Madison family in Chicago adopt Rose, but DeFarge kills her new family under orders from Deathstroke. Deathstroke apologizes to Rose for abandoning her and suggests that she become his apprentice. Rose accepts, kills DeFarge, and takes the name "Ravager" for herself. Deathstroke secretly injects Rose with the same serum that gave him his abilities, causing her to suffer from psychosis.

Deathstroke doubts Rose's readiness to work with him and plans to disown her after she hesitates and is unable to kill Deathstroke's son Jericho when he possesses Beast Boy. To prove her loyalty, she gouges out an eye to match his missing eye.

Batgirl vs Ravager. Cover to Batgirl #64 (2005). Art by Alé Garza.

Deathstroke places Rose under the tutelage of Nightwing, who agrees to train her. To test Dick's loyalty, Deathstroke replaces Rose's missing eye with one made from kryptonite and pits her and Nightwing against Superman. After learning that kryptonite is harmful to humans with prolonged exposure and that Deathstroke endangered her life, Rose breaks all ties with her father and runs away.

One year after the events depicted in the Infinite Crisis crossover, Rose once again joins the Teen Titans. She wears the same costume and wields two katana-style swords. With Deathstroke and his serum's influence gone, Rose appears more balanced than previously depicted.

In the series Terror Titans, Rose joins the Dark Side Club after the Titans reject her for almost killing Persuader. She agrees to take part in one of the Dark Side Club's arena battles, fighting against Fever. Rose defeats Fever, but refuses to kill her, prompting Clock King to kill her instead. Although appalled by Fever's death, Rose stays, hoping to find out what Clock King's plan is. Rose confronts Clock King, who manages to escape.

In the Blackest Night event, Rose tracks Deathstroke down to his old mentor Wintergreen's house and attacks him. During the fight, the two are attacked by their deceased relatives Grant, Wade and Adeline, who, along with Wintergreen, have all been reanimated as Black Lanterns. When Grant attacks Deathstroke, intending to burn him in a fireplace, Rose reluctantly intervenes, saving her hated father. She then attempts to incinerate Wade, but is surprised when Jericho jumps out of his body. Jericho uses his powers to make the Black Lanterns destroy themselves. After the battle, Rose refuses to reconcile with Deathstroke, despite acknowledging her love for him.

Following an adventure in another dimension, Static, Miss Martian, Bombshell, and Aquagirl leave the Titans, and Rose is invited to rejoin the team to help build it back up. While staying in the Tower, Rose hacks into the team computer and begins searching for information on her mother, who she believes to be alive. During her time with the group, Rose begins flirting with Superboy and befriends Damian Wayne, the new Robin. She remains with the team up until the final battle with Superboy-Prime and the Legion of Doom, where she teams with Speedy to take down Persuader.

=== The New 52 ===
Following the events of "Flashpoint", the DC Universe was relaunched. In the New 52, Rose now has both eyes intact and does not go by the name Ravager, though she still appears to have her martial arts training and trademark swords. She is a teenaged mercenary hired by the shadowy organization N.O.W.H.E.R.E. to act as a handler for Superboy after he destroyed the N.O.W.H.E.R.E. lab used to create him in self-defense. Rose has a rivalry with Caitlin Fairchild, a young N.O.W.H.E.R.E. researcher who cares for Superboy. Her origin is altered so that she is now the daughter of Slade Wilson and Adeline Kane, removing her Asian heritage in the process.

After last seen by the side of her father Deathstroke, following the events that happened in The Ravagers, she reappears 20 years in the future. In this timeline she is along her husband Garfield Logan, now known as Beast Man, living together in the Justice League Watchtower as Beast Man is the only Justice Leaguer alive. The two also have a daughter named Red who is being mentored by them along other superpowered teenagers for them to become a team. After an encounter with three members of the Teen Titans from the present Red Robin, Wonder Girl and Superboy, Rose and Gar put in action a plan to swap Superboy with his genetic donor (Jon Lane Kent), who is responsible for the tragedy that happened in that future, to prevent those events from happening again. The plan is a success as Raven's soul-self departs with the Titans from the present and the unconscious Jon.

=== DC Rebirth ===
Rose later reappears after the DC Rebirth relaunch, with her original Cambodian origin and mixed-race heritage now restored and both eyes intact. She is seen working as a strip club bouncer who moonlights as a teenage mercenary, and reunites with her father after someone puts a hit on her. Her past in the New 52 continuity also appears to be retconned, as she makes no mention of N.O.W.H.E.R.E., and claims to have been trained by Nightwing, much to Slade's annoyance.

== Powers and abilities ==
=== Original powers ===
Inherited abilities from her progenitor, enhanced via mainlining of the super soldier serum that gave Deathstroke his powers. Rose Wilson possesses increased reflexes, stamina, agility, speed, strength and heightened mental acuity. But was also prone to psychotic episodes, such as when she gouged out her own eye to be more like her father while under its effects. She has received some training from Nightwing, including the virtues of being a hero. She also possesses a precognitive sense that lets her see into the immediate future. This allows her to react to oncoming attacks against her and to counter them accordingly.

She currently wields twin energy katanas that can cut through anything except flesh, and briefly merge into an energy shield. She also carries with her a small stash of adrenaline, both because Clock King had briefly managed to make her addicted to the substance, and also because while high on adrenaline her precognitive sense evolves into the ability to glimpse scenes from her immediate future. However, the more she uses adrenaline to enhance her powers, the more her metabolism is unbalanced, straining her health.

=== The New 52 and DC Rebirth powers ===
In The New 52 continuity, Rose is a metahuman with the ability to negate superpowers. Her powers psychically link her to other Gen-Actives, enabling multi-way mental communication with people enhanced by the Gen Factor.

In Rebirth publishing, Ravager possesses a variation of the enhanced mind her father possessed; beyond the simple augmented brain percentage giving Deathstroke his genius intellect, Rose has an accelerated probability factor wherein she can predict the future via cataloging and assembling details in an accurate outcome assessment.

== Other versions ==
- An alternate universe version of Rose Wilson appears in "Titans Tomorrow". This version is a member of Titans East and part of a resistance against the Teen Titans, who have become dictators.
- An alternate universe version of Rose Wilson appears in Flashpoint.
- An alternate universe version of Rose Wilson appears in DC Comics Bombshells. This version is a pirate and a founding member of the Suicide Squad.

== In other media ==
=== Television ===
Chelsea Zhang as Rose Wilson / Ravager in Titans.

- A character loosely based on Rose Wilson / Ravager named Isabel Rochev appears in the second season of Arrow, portrayed by Summer Glau. She was trained by Slade Wilson to help him seek revenge on Oliver Queen. She initially infiltrates Queen Consolidated to take over the company until she is mortally wounded by John Diggle. She receives a blood transfusion and is injected with the super-soldier serum Mirakuru to enhance her physical capabilities. Adopting the alias of "Ravager", she attempts to seek revenge on Diggle. Despite being hit by a vehicle driven by Felicity Smoak, Rochev survives and assassinates several Starling City citizens on Slade's orders. By the end of the season, she is captured by Oliver, his allies, and members of the League of Assassins and killed by Nyssa al Ghul.
- Rose Wilson as Ravager appears in Teen Titans Go! (2013), voiced by Pamela Adlon. This version is a recurring enemy of the eponymous Titans and friend of Raven, Starfire, Jinx, and Terra.
- Rose Wilson as Ravager appears in the second season of Titans, portrayed by Chelsea Zhang. Following an extramarital affair between Deathstroke and an unnamed prostitute, this version inherited his healing factor, became a skilled combatant, and was initially unaware of her father's identity. After seeking him out, she was recruited by Deathstroke to serve as a mole in the Titans at the cost of her left eye. She works with and secretly helps disband the Titans, claiming she wants revenge on Deathstroke to avenge her dead half-brother Jericho, until her mission is compromised by her budding relationship with Jason Todd, who leaves her upon learning her true intentions, and Dick Grayson revealing Deathstroke killed Jericho. Rose subsequently betrays her father and grievously injures him, unknowingly causing Jericho's spirit to leave him and possess her, before joining a new iteration of the Titans.
- Rose Wilson appears in the DC Super Hero Girls (2019) episode "#DinnerForFive", voiced by Chelsea Kane. This version is a friend of Barbara Gordon and displays more morality than other incarnations.

=== Film ===
Rose Wilson (right) as she appears in Justice League: Crisis on Two Earths.

- An alternate universe incarnation of Rose Wilson appears in Justice League: Crisis on Two Earths, voiced by Freddi Rogers. This version is the daughter of President Slade Wilson who opposes his policy of appeasement towards the Crime Syndicate. After the Justice League travel to the alternate Earth to fight the Syndicate, Martian Manhunter falls in love with Rose after saving her from an assassination attempt and volunteers to be her bodyguard. After the League defeat the Syndicate, Manhunter reluctantly parts ways with her.
- Rose Wilson appears in Deathstroke: Knights & Dragons: The Movie, voiced by Faye Mata. This version is the leader of H.I.V.E. following the apparent death of its previous leader, Jackal.

=== Video games ===
- Rose Wilson as Ravager appears in DC Universe Online.
- Rose Wilson as Ravager appears as a support card in the mobile version of Injustice: Gods Among Us.
- Rose Wilson as Ravager appears as a character summon in Scribblenauts Unmasked: A DC Comics Adventure.
- The Teen Titans Go! (2013) incarnation of Rose Wilson / Ravager appears as a non-playable character in Lego Dimensions, voiced again by Pamela Adlon.
- Rose Wilson as Ravager appears as a playable character in Lego DC Super-Villains.
- Rose Wilson as Ravager appears as a playable character in DC Legends.

=== Miscellaneous ===
- Rose Wilson as Ravager appears in Teen Titans Go! (2004) #49. She battles the Teen Titans in an attempt to continue her father Slade's legacy before they help her realize she is free to make her own decisions in life and offer her a home and family. Moved by their words, Rose decides to train with them.
- Rose Wilson as Ravager appears in Smallville Season 11. After her father Slade was imprisoned in the Phantom Zone and rendered catatonic, she attempts to continue his work by killing the next generation of superheroes, the Teen Titans.
- Rose Wilson as Ravager makes cameo appearances in DC Super Hero Girls (2015).
- Isabel Rochev appears in the Arrow tie-in novel Arrow: Vengeance. Born in Moscow, Russia to Viktor Rochev and an unnamed woman, her parents were killed by the Solntsevskaya Bratva when she was nine, leading to her being adopted by an American couple and moving to the United States. Growing up, she experienced trouble making friends in school due to her accent, which took years for her to overcome. After eventually entering business school, she became an intern at Queen Consolidated, through which she met and entered an affair with the CEO Robert Queen. They planned to run away together, but her internship was cancelled and Robert never spoke to her again, leaving her bitter and desiring revenge. Following this, she became vice-president of acquisitions at Stellmoor International to buy out Queen Consolidated before joining forces with Slade Wilson and undergoing a rigorous training regimen. After Oliver Queen leaves Starling City for failing to stop Malcolm Merlyn's "Undertaking", Slade planted Rochev in Queen Consolidated to draw Oliver back.
