= Chris Jai Alex =

American actor

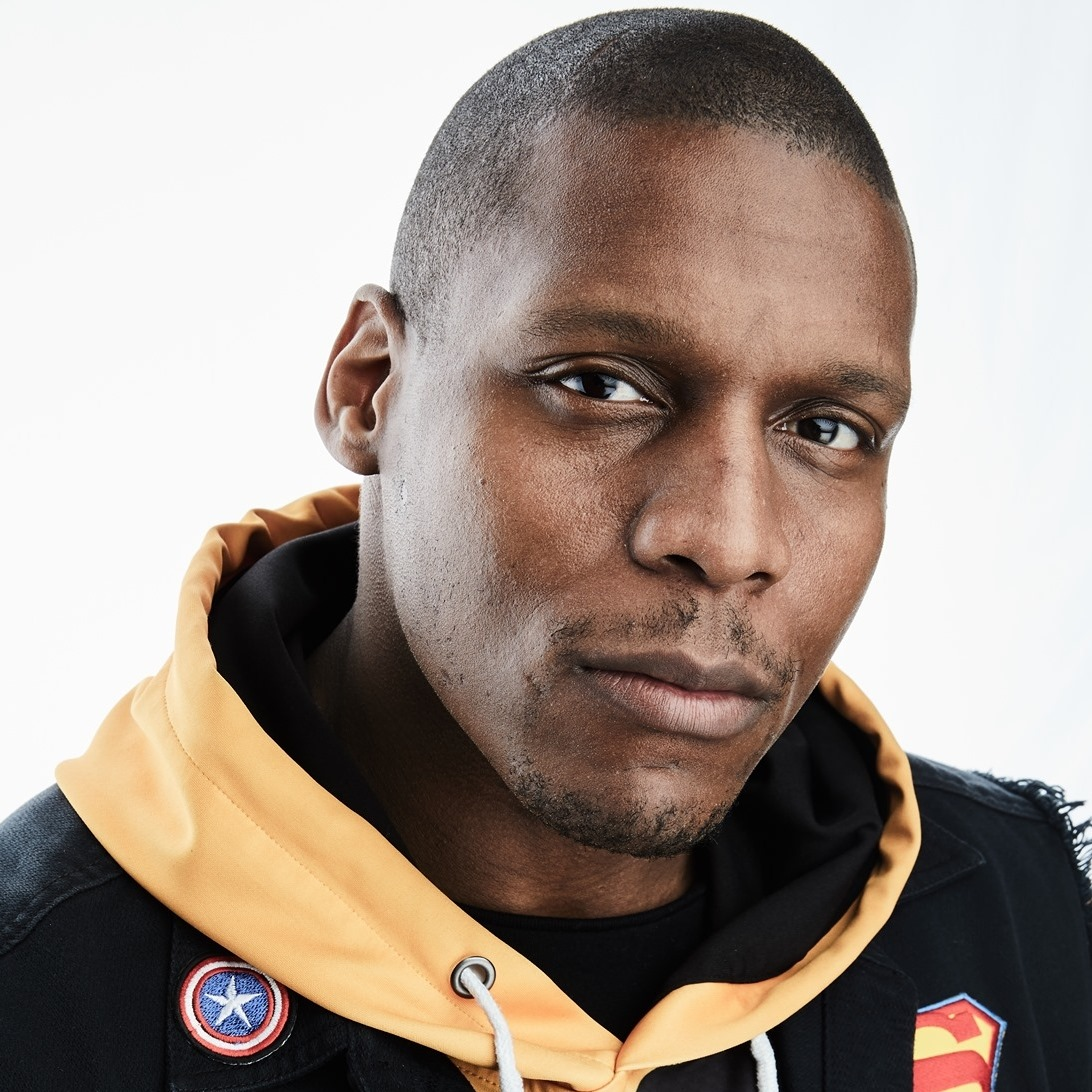
- Born: February 16, 1982 (age 44); Lansing, Michigan
- Occupations: Writer, director, producer, actor, voice actor, and stunt performer
- Years active: 2005

Chris Jai Alex, is an American writer, director, producer, and actor involved in various projects in production and development. His work encompasses film, television, voice acting, motion capturing, and directing. He has worked with directors such as Sam Hargrave, Rupert Wyatt, Bryan Singer, and Keith Arem. He also contributed to studio productions, independent films, and video games.

== Early life and education ==
Alex was born and raised in Lansing, Michigan. He grew up in a family with an interest in music and taught himself piano, guitar, and music production. After high school, he co-founded an independent record label with his brother and later moved to Los Angeles to work in acting, stunt work, and filmmaking.

== Career ==
Alex began his career in the entertainment industry as a martial artist and stunt performer. He trained under Chad Stahelski at 8711 Action Design and performed stunts in films including Thor: The Dark World, Captain America: Civil War, and Batman v Superman: Dawn of Justice.

He transitioned into voice acting, providing voices for characters in anime and video games. His voice roles include Lord Boros in the English dub of One-Punch Man, Esidisi in JoJo's Bizarre Adventure, Marvel's Spider-Man, and Mace in Call of Duty: Modern Warfare. He also performed voice and motion capture for the character Strife in Darksiders Genesis.

In addition to his acting and voice work, Alex has been involved in filmmaking. He wrote, directed, and acted in the 2023 action film Get the Girl. He has also authored the graphic novel Kill Blanket. Alex founded the independent records label Phineqx Entertainment, which has produced music and multimedia projects.

== Filmography ==
=== Film ===
Year	Title	Role	Notes
2008	Mia and the Migoo	Charlemagne (voice)	English dub
2010	Hard Breakers	Eddie	
2012	Sir Billi	Golf Player (voice)	
2013	Evidence	Cop #1	
2015	4Got10	Agent Black	
2015	6 Ways to Die	Frank Casper	
2016	Decommissioned	Peter Morris	
2016	Mobile Suit Gundam Thunderbolt: December Sky	Fisher Ness (voice)	English dub
2016	A Silent Voice	Pedro (voice)	English dub
2017	Mutafukaz	Various voices	English dub
2019	Bolden	Harvey	Stunts
2020	Extraction	Thiago	Directed by Sam Hargrave
2020	Deathstroke: Knights & Dragons – The Movie	Jackal (voice)	
2020	The 2nd	John	
2021	Overrun	Corvo	
2022	Pursuit	Samael "Manos de Rosas"	
2023	Get the Girl	Sebastian "Bash" Danye	Also writer, director, and producer

=== Television ===
Year	Title	Role	Notes
2008	The Boondocks	Catcher Freeman (voice)	
2013	JoJo's Bizarre Adventure: Battle Tendency	Esidisi (voice)	English dub
2014-2016	Steven Universe	Various voices	Recurring roles
2015	Teen Wolf	Prison Guard	
2016	Supergirl	Guard #1	Guest
2016	It's Always Sunny in Philadelphia	Bailiff	
2016	Bailiff	Greyhat	
2019-2020	She-Ra and the Princesses of Power	George (voice)	
2020	ThunderCats Roar	Panthro, various voices (voice)	Main role
2020	Deathstroke: Knights & Dragons	Jackal (voice)	
2022	Blade Runner: Black Lotus	Acting Chief / Guards (voice)	
2023	Fright Krewe	Otis Brunday (voice)	

=== Video games ===
Year	Title	Role	Note
2009	Resident Evil 5	Majini / Soldiers	Voice and motion capture
2013	Killzone Shadow Fall	Helghast Soldier	Voice
2014	Transformers: Rise of the Dark Spark	Drift	Voice
2016	XCOM 2	Advent Trooper / Soldier	
2016	Titanfall 2	Bear	
2017	LawBreakers	Axel	
2017	Uncharted: The Lost Legacy	Shoreline Mercenary	Voice and motion capture
2018	Marvel's Spider-Man	Civilian / EMT voices	
2019	Call of Duty: Modern Warfare	Mace	Voice
2019	Darksiders Genesis	Strife	Voice
2020	Final Fantasy VII Remake	Kotch	Voice
2022	God of War Ragnarök	Additional voices	
2024	The Legend of Heroes: Trails Through Daybreak	Kurogane	Voice

== Awards ==
Year	Award / Organization	Work	Category / Result
2017	Behind the Voice Actors Awards	Mobile Suit Gundam Thunderbolt: December Sky	Nominee – Best Voice Acting Ensemble Cast
2018	Behind the Voice Actors Awards	Mobile Suit Gundam Thunderbolt: Flower Bandit	Nominee – Best Voice Acting Ensemble Cast
