= Deathstroke: Knights & Dragons =

2020 superhero animated film

Deathstroke: Knights & Dragons - The Movie
- Promotional poster
- Directed by: Sung Jin Ahn
- Written by: J. M. DeMatteis
- Based on: Deathstroke by Marv Wolfman and George Pérez
- Produced by: Sam Register; Sarah Schechter
- Starring: Michael Chiklis; Sasha Alexander
- Music by: Kevin Riepl
- Production companies: Warner Bros. Animation; Blue Ribbon Content; DC Entertainment; Berlanti Productions
- Distributed by: Warner Bros. Home Entertainment
- Release date: August 4, 2020
- Running time: 87 minutes
- Country: United States
- Language: English

Deathstroke: Knights & Dragons is a 2020 American animated superhero film directed by Sung Jin Ahn. It follows Slade Wilson's origin story, who gains enhanced abilities after a military experiment and becomes the mercenary known as Deathstroke. The story explores his turbulent relationships with his family, including his estranged wife Adeline and his children Joseph and Rose, while confronting the consequences of his violent past and faces enemies like H.I.V.E. and his daughter Rose, who has joined the villains.

Initially released on January 6, 2020, as a web series on CW Seed, it was planned as a 12-episode run. However, after the first two episode aired, these plans were altered and the project was repurposed into a direct-to-video animated film titled Deathstroke: Knights & Dragons: The Movie, which was released digitally and on Blu-ray in August of the same year. The film received mixed reviews.

== Plot ==
Following an accident, Slade Wilson is saved by an experimental drug from which he develops super strength, enhanced agility, and regeneration. He decides to use these new abilities to become the mercenary "Deathstroke" with the help of his friend William Wintergreen. Slade then marries general Adeline "Addie" Kane. Together, they have a son named Joseph.

While on a mission in Cambodia, Deathstroke meets Lillian, a woman who he falls in love with. Unbeknownst to Slade, after he completes his mission and leaves, Lillian gives birth to Rose, a girl who becomes orphaned after her mother dies in a hit and run. Rose lives alone until she is rescued by Jackal, the mysterious leader of a secret organization known as H.I.V.E. He trains her to one day become his successor. Jackal later kidnaps Joseph. Slade returns home from a mission abroad and finds Addie, angered after discovering about his secret life as an assassin. Slade promises to bring back Joseph and hunts down Jackal at his base of operations. There, Deathstroke is confronted by Jackal's agents Bronze Tiger and an unnamed woman. In the ensuing fight, Slade kills the woman, cuts Tiger's arm off and heads to kill Jackal. Just before Slade can rescue Joseph, his throat is slit, rendering him mute. After Joseph becomes hospitalized, Addie breaks up with Slade. She then isolates Joseph at a private school to hide him from Slade.

Ten years later, Slade continues operating as Deathstroke. One night, he is contacted by the H.I.V.E. Queen - H.I.V.E.'s new leader - who has Joseph hostage for his psychic abilities, which he inherited from Slade. This reunites him with Adeline, who wants to join Slade in the rescue mission but he is reluctant. Before Slade leaves, Adeline shares a kiss with him.

Slade's hunt for the Queen leads him to Colonel Kapoor, a former agent of H.I.V.E. Kapoor's intel takes Slade to Kaznia where he confronts Tiger, now a freelancer. In the ensuing battle, Tiger reveals that Jackal is alive and the Queen is located at the Kerguelen Islands. Wintergreen takes Slade there. Upon his arrival, he is attacked by Sandra Woosan / Lady Shiva. Slade surrenders and is taken to the Queen. The Queen reveals she had trained Joseph to use his abilities as a weapon known as "Jericho". Slade rescues Joseph, who reveals he has joined H.I.V.E. as Jericho. The Queen is actually Slade's daughter Rose, Joseph's half-sister. Slade is shot into the ocean, but, using his regeneration powers, he refuses to die. Addie fishes him out, revealing she had placed a tracking device through the kiss they shared earlier. Slade reveals his affair with Lillian to Addie. Rose informs Jackal about Slade's supposed death, pleasing him. During training, Jericho's powers become out of control, but Rose stops him. Slade, Addie, and Wintergreen discover H.I.V.E.'s plan to use Jericho's abilities to control the world.

Jackal conducts a series of coordinated attacks across the United States to lure the president out. While boarding a H.I.V.E plane, Rose and Jericho betray Jackal, realizing he had manipulated them into becoming rogue. In the ensuing fight, they discover Jackal's suit is designed to repel Joseph's psychic attacks. Slade and Addie then board the plane and confront Jackal and Shiva. Shiva holds Rose and Jericho hostage. Slade heads to fight Jackal while Addie fights Shiva, who Rose manages to kill. During this fight, it is revealed that the woman who Slade killed while rescuing Joseph years ago was Jackal's daughter. That is why he took Slade's children under his wing. Jackal shoots at Slade with his armor's powers, but Slade redirects the blast, leaving an opening in the plane. Slade and Jackal fall out of it. While falling, Slade places a bomb on Jackal, appearing to kill them both.

Back home, Jericho starts to reminisce about his father, while Addie officially welcomes Rose into the Wilson family. At a beach elsewhere, Slade's body is washed up and appears to still be alive.

== Cast ==
- Michael Chiklis as Slade Wilson / Deathstroke
- Sasha Alexander as Adeline "Addie" Kane
- Griffin Puatu as Joseph Wilson / Jericho
  - Asher Bishop as young Joseph Wilson
- Castulo Guerra as General Suarez, Doctor
- Delbert Hunt as Bronze Tiger
- Chris Jai Alex as Jackal
- Faye Mata as H.I.V.E. Queen (Rose Wilson), Jade
- Panta Mosleh as Lady Shiva, Nurse
- Colin Salmon as William Wintergreen
- Imari Williams as president, H.I.V.E. Pilot
- Minae Noji as Secretary of State
- Noshir Dalal as Kapoor

== Production ==
Title card

Originally conceived as a multi-episode web-series, Deathstroke: Knights & Dragons was announced in May 2019 and aired on the CW Seed. It was planned as a short-form production consisting of 12 episodes, all written by J. M. DeMatteis and directed by Sung Jin Ahn. The voice cast of the series was revealed in late October alongside a teaser trailer which was released online. The film version of the story was released on August 4 the same year, on Blu-ray and digital platforms with the same voice cast from the series.

== Reception ==
Deathstroke: Knights & Dragons has earned around $3.9 million from domestic Blu-ray sales, and it was the top-selling Blu-ray Disc on the NPD VideoScan First Alert chart for the week ending August 9, 2020. The film garnered a range of reviews from critics. On review aggregator Rotten Tomatoes, the film has an approval rating of 82% based on 11 reviews, with an average rating of 6/10. Jonathan Garcia from Dynamic Duel Podcast rated it three and a half out of five stars, praising its thematic complexity despite a cheap appearance. Jeffrey Lyles from Lyles' Movie Files scored it six out of ten and felt that the lack of restraint hurt the film. Brian Costello of Common Sense Media gave it three out of five stars and called it a violent superhero tale. Hasitha Fernando from Flickering Myth enjoyed the animation and voice acting, while Luke Y. Thompson of SuperHeroHype rated it two out of five, criticizing the "posturing adolescent" quality of the voice acting. ComicBookMovie's Josh Wilding and Nicola Austin of We Have a Hulk gave a scores of three and a half and three out of five, respectively. Julian Roman from MovieWeb rated it two and a half out of five due to muddled dialogue. Burt Peterson of SciFiNow gave it three out of five, noting a lack of balance, while John Serba from Decider found it cliché-ridden. Jonathon Wilson from Ready Steady Cut acknowledged its solid action, rating it three and a half out of five.
