= Deathstroke =

Supervillain appearing in DC Comics

- Deathstroke in character artwork by Carmine Di Giandomenico for Deathstroke: The Terminator (2025)

Publication information
- Publisher: DC Comics
- First appearance: The New Teen Titans #2 (December 1980)
- Created by: Marv Wolfman (writer); George Pérez (artist)

In-story information
- Alter ego: Major Slade Joseph Wilson
- Species: Metahuman
- Team affiliations: Secret Society of Super Villains; Injustice League; H.I.V.E.; United States Army; Titans East; Titans; Justice League; Suicide Squad; League of Assassins
- Notable aliases: Deathstroke the Terminator
- Abilities: Enhanced intellect and mental capacity; Superhuman strength, speed, stamina, agility, durability, reflexes, and senses; Master assassin; Accelerated healing; Decelerated aging; Master hand-to-hand combatant, martial artist, swordsman, and marksman

Deathstroke is a supervillain appearing in American comic books published by DC Comics. Created by writer Marv Wolfman and artist George Pérez, the character first appeared in The New Teen Titans #2 (1980) as Deathstroke the Terminator.

Deathstroke is the alias of Slade Joseph Wilson, a mercenary and former U.S. Army soldier who gains enhanced physical and mental abilities from an experimental super-soldier serum. Regarded as the greatest and deadliest assassin in the DC Universe, he serves as the archenemy of Dick Grayson and the Teen Titans, although he has also fought other superheroes, including Grayson’s mentor Batman, Green Arrow, and the Justice League. Deathstroke's vendetta against the Titans began when he swore revenge for the death of his eldest son Grant; his other two children, Joseph and Rose, would go on to join the Titans to oppose him. A bicolored black-and-orange mask that covers his missing right eye serves as Deathstroke's visual motif.

The character has been adapted in various media incarnations, having been portrayed in television by Michael Hogan in Smallville, Manu Bennett in Arrow, and Esai Morales in Titans; and in film by Joe Manganiello in Justice League and its director's cut. Ron Perlman and others have provided Deathstroke's voice in animation and video games.

== Publication history ==
Deathstroke the Terminator was created by Marv Wolfman and George Pérez, and made his first appearance in The New Teen Titans #2 in December 1980.

Due to his popularity, Deathstroke received his own series, Deathstroke the Terminator, in 1991. It was retitled Deathstroke the Hunted for issues #0 and #41–45; and then simply Deathstroke for issues #46–60. The series was cancelled with issue #60. In total, Deathstroke ran for 65 issues (#1–60, plus four Annuals and a special #0 issue).

Deathstroke will receive a new ongoing series in March 2026 as part of the "DC Next Level" publishing initiative.

The character’s popularity with readers also led Rob Liefeld to create the popular Marvel Comics character Deadpool (Wade Wilson), whose name, powers, and costume were originally patterned on Deathstroke.

Following his injury in DC Universe: Last Will and Testament, Deathstroke appears in one of the four Faces of Evil one-shots, written by David Hine.

Despite predating James Cameron's film The Terminator by four years, the character is now simply called Deathstroke, though the full title has not completely fallen out of use, having been referenced in Justice League Elite.

== Fictional character biography ==
Deathstroke the Terminator, as he was originally depicted on the cover of Tales of the Teen Titans #44 (July 1984). Art by George Pérez.

Slade Wilson was 16 years old when he illegally enlisted in the United States Army, having lied about his age. After participation in the Korean War, he was assigned to Camp Washington, where he had been promoted to the rank of major. In the early 1960s, he met Captain Adeline Kane, who was impressed by his talent and offered to privately train him in guerrilla warfare. In less than a year, Slade mastered every fighting form presented to him and was soon promoted to the rank of lieutenant colonel. Six months later, Slade and Adeline were married and she became pregnant with their first child. Slade was sent to serve in the Vietnam War, where he met SAS member William Wintergreen. While serving in Vietnam, Slade was given a drug that allowed him to utilize and use up to 90% of his brain's capacity, granting him enhanced physical powers, an accelerated healing factor, and heightened senses. Soon after the experiment, Slade becomes a mercenary without the knowledge of his family.

The criminal Jackal takes Slade's younger son Joseph hostage to force Slade to divulge the name of a client who had hired him as an assassin. Slade refuses, claiming that doing so would violate his personal code of honor. Despite Slade's efforts, Joseph's throat is slit by his kidnappers, leaving him mute. After taking Joseph to the hospital, Adeline is enraged at Slade's endangerment of Joseph and tries to kill Slade by shooting him, but only manages to destroy his right eye.

=== The Teen Titans ===
Slade has a long history as an enemy of the Teen Titans, beginning when his older son Grant receives superhuman enhancements from H.I.V.E., becomes Ravager, and accepts a contract to kill or capture the Teen Titans. However, Grant's enhancements prove fatal and kill him, with Slade agreeing to complete the contract. His first mission involves stealing the element Promethium from S.T.A.R. Labs and selling it as a weapon. He then kidnaps the Titans and places them in the path of a Promethium bomb to test his device. The Titans escape and pursue Deathstroke, but he severely wounds Changeling in his escape.

Deathstroke next appears in New York, holding officials hostage to lure the Titans into confronting him. Terra, a new ally of the Titans, and Changeling are the only ones available to answer the call. Terra knocks Changeling out and battles Deathstroke single-handedly in an effort to prove herself worthy of being a Titan. Deathstroke escapes as the other Titans arrive, but by then Terra had proven herself and the team offers her membership. Terra and Deathstroke had secretly conspired to fake the fight in a plot to infiltrate the team.

=== The Judas Contract ===
During The Judas Contract storyline, the Titans entrust Terra with all of their secret identities. Once Slade has this information, he uses it to systematically subdue each of the Titans, exploiting them at their weakest moments. Dick Grayson avoids being captured and meets with Adeline and Joseph Wilson. Grayson takes the new identity of Nightwing and confronts Deathstroke and H.I.V.E. alongside Joseph Wilson, who has assumed the name Jericho. During the confrontation, Jericho frees the Titans by possessing Slade's body. While trying to kill the Titans, Terra causes the H.I.V.E. building to collapse, killing herself. In the aftermath, Changeling attempts to kill Slade, but relents after realizing that Slade was not fully responsible for Terra's actions.

=== Titans Hunt ===
Slade comes to the Titans' assistance during the Titans Hunt storyline, when many Titans members disappear in a manner very similar to how they were abducted during the Judas Contract. Slade and Nightwing discover that the abductions were the work of the Wildebeest Society, and that their leader was Jericho. Jericho had been possessed by the corrupted souls of Azarath, who intended to capture the Titans and use them as host bodies. Slade is forced to kill Jericho to save the other Titans. Afterward, Slade continued his life as a mercenary, but also acted as an occasional ally to the Titans, aiding them when mutual threats outweighed their animosity.

=== Family business ===
Meanwhile, Slade's relationship with his estranged wife Adeline took a tragic turn, as Slade underwent a process to gain the ability of physical regeneration, allowing him to survive any wound so long as his brain is intact. After gaining this power, Slade is forced to give his wife a blood transfusion to save her life, resulting in her gaining a similar healing factor. This alteration of her DNA drives Adeline insane, leading her to form a new version of H.I.V.E. During the ensuing battle, Adeline's throat is slit, but her healing factor will not fully heal her body or allow her to die. Starfire is forced to kill Adeline, causing Slade to renounce all ties with the Titans.

It is revealed that Jericho managed to transfer his consciousness into Deathstroke in the instant before his death. Taking control of his father, Jericho forces Deathstroke to murder Wintergreen. He then launches a series of attacks against the current Teen Titans before leaving his father's body. Deathstroke manipulates his daughter Rose Wilson into the mercenary business as the new Ravager, to find and kill Jericho, using a specially designed serum to heighten her hostility and push her over the edge. Unfortunately, the process also resulted in Rose being driven at least partially insane, to the extent that she cuts out her own left eye in an attempt to prove to her father that she was just like him.

=== Infinite Crisis ===
Deathstroke is a founding member of Lex Luthor's Secret Society of Super Villains in the Infinite Crisis storyline. He was seen in Infinite Crisis #1, hiding in a warehouse south of Metropolis waiting to ambush the Freedom Fighters with several other members. The battle did not last long, and by the end, Deathstroke had killed the Phantom Lady. Slade also shoots Uncle Sam in the back, leading to his apparent death.

He was the employer of Nightwing, whom he hired to train his daughter Rose. However, after the two have a confrontation with Superman, Deathstroke discovers that Nightwing had been teaching Rose the values of heroism. He could not kill Grayson in front of his daughter, because doing so would undo all of Slade's teachings. Nightwing offered a deal: he would stay away from Rose if Slade would keep metahuman villains out of Blüdhaven. The deal held for 34 hours until Infinite Crisis #4, when Slade, under the orders of Alexander Luthor Jr., drops Chemo on Blüdhaven, killing over 100,000 people.

=== One Year Later ===
Cover of Teen Titans (vol. 3) #43: "Titans East Part 1". Art by Tony Daniel.

In the publishing line One Year Later, Deathstroke assembles a counter-team of teen superhumans known as Titans East. The current Titans team includes Ravager, who now wanted nothing to do with her father. Deathstroke blackmails former Teen Titans member Risk while at the same time offering him an outlet for his rage, drugs Batgirl with the same serum he had used on Rose, and supplies Inertia with a formula that granted superhuman speed to compensate for the loss of his connection to the Speed Force. His team, however, slowly fell apart over the course of the attack, as Robin managed to free Batgirl of his mind control serum and Raven convinced Duela Dent to switch sides. Slade and his remaining Titans subsequently faced off against both the current Titans and a group of old Titans led by Nightwing. Although he was defeated, he still managed to escape with the aid of Inertia. In the end, however, it was revealed to the readers that Slade's real mission was to provide his children with something he could never offer them: a real family, in the form of the Teen Titans. By attacking the Titans, he insured that Rose and Jericho would become more trusted by their associates, and thus grow closer to the team.

=== Blackest Night ===
In the Teen Titans (vol. 3) tie-in to the Blackest Night crossover event, Deathstroke is living in the deceased Wintergreen's house and reading his journal, when he is attacked by Rose again. During the fight, the two are attacked by their deceased relatives Grant, Wade, and Adeline, who, along with Wintergreen, have all been reanimated as Black Lanterns. Deathstroke and Rose are forced to work together and fight for their lives against the Black Lanterns.

The two hopelessly fight the regenerating Black Lanterns until Jericho, cured from his earlier insanity, arrives and turns the tide of the fight. During the course of the battle, Deathstroke confesses to his children that part of the reason why he menaced the Teen Titans for so many years was that he felt that by forcing his children to hate him, they would have a chance of escaping the sorrow and pain that a life with him would entail. Just as Slade is overwhelmed and about to be killed, Jericho uses his abilities to possess the Black Lanterns and sever their connection with their power rings, killing them once more. After realizing that her mother was not reborn as a member of the Black Lantern Corps, Rose comes to the conclusion that she must somehow still be alive, and leaves after threatening to kill Slade if he tries to stop her. Jericho chooses to stay with his father, reasoning that only Slade would have the courage to kill him if he were to ever return to madness.

=== Titans: Villains for Hire ===
Following his encounter with the Black Lanterns, Deathstroke recruits a team of supervillains consisting of Tattooed Man, Cheshire, Osiris, and the new character Cinder following the launch of Brightest Day. The team ambushes Ryan Choi in his home, and then battles him. This ends with Deathstroke driving his sword through Ryan's chest, killing him. He then gives Ryan's body to Dwarfstar.

Following the assassination of Atom, Deathstroke and the Titans are hired to kill Lex Luthor during his stay in Midway City. The attack is revealed to be a ruse crafted by Slade and Luthor to draw out a traitor on Luthor's security staff, who is revealed to be a shape-shifting assassin named Facade. After the Titans capture Facade and turn him over to the scientists at LexCorp, Luthor rewards Slade by examining technology that he had earlier ordered Tattooed Man and Cheshire to steal. Slade claims that this will bring him one step closer to his true goal: the ability to cheat death itself. He also succeeds in recruiting Arsenal, a former member of the Teen Titans and Justice League, into the team. Shortly after inducting Arsenal into the team, Slade accepts a mission to rescue a child from a drug lord named Elijah. After discovering that Elijah is using the bodies of kidnapped children to create an addictive drug called Bliss, the Titans promptly kill the gangster and shut down his operation. As the Titans are preparing to return to the Labyrinth, Cheshire notices that Slade has tied up DJ Molecule, a powerful metahuman who was working for Elijah as a bodyguard. When asked what he is doing with the young man, Slade cryptically responds by saying that he only accepted the mission to capture Molecule for some unknown purpose.

Afterward, Slade and his team arrive at South Pacific Island to kill cult leader Drago over the arena production of blind warriors; however, his team, Arsenal, and Cheshire betray him, revealing that they had been working with Drago. While Slade is held captive, Drago arrives and reveals to him that he is actually Slade's old friend, Corporal Daniel Rogers, who abandoned him during the civil war in Afghanistan. Drago then gouges out Slade's left eye making him blind. Slade is then imprisoned along with Arsenal and begins to tell him about his past with Drago. Later, Drago takes a trip down memory lane with Slade, explaining how he lost his sight, and basically re-telling his origin and how it involved Jeremiah, right before he throws Slade beneath the complex to fend for his life against a crazed subhuman. During the fights, Slade's left eye was restored due to his metahuman healing factor, and the Titans arrive to rescue him. Slade and the Titans break into Drago's mansion and attack. Slade drugs Drago so that he cannot focus his telepathic powers. When Drago is defeated, Slade allows him to live and the Titans then leave his island. While returning to the labyrinth, Slade and the Titans are approached by the Atom and the Justice League, who attempt to arrest them for the murder of Ryan Choi.

During the battle of Slade's Titans against the Justice League, the battle is stopped by Isis, who forces them to choose between leaving or continuing the fight and starting World War III. The Justice League chose to retreat and Slade retrieves a sample of Supergirl's Kryptonian blood. Upon returning to the labyrinth, with his workers, Doctor Sivana and Doctor Impossible, Slade reveals to the Titans that their efforts support creation of the Methuselah Device, which will heal Jericho.

The machine successfully heals Jericho, and Slade offers its abilities to all the Titans, offering to restore their deceased loved ones as payment for their services. All agree but Cinder, who does not want her brothers to live forever, as she claims to be doing. She attacks Cheshire and Osiris, and is then joined by Tattooed Man and Arsenal. As the Titans come to blows, Deathstroke attempts to take Jericho and leave, but Jericho, disgusted at what his father did to achieve his restoration, takes over his body, intending to destroy first the Methuselah Device, then himself and Deathstroke. While the Titans fight over the Methuselah Device, its power source, a metahuman named DJ Molecule, is released. Molecule blasts Slade, knocking Jericho out of his body. Arsenal then attacks him for stealing the Titans' legacy. Slade escapes and the Methuselah Device is destroyed by Cinder. Afterwards, Slade berates himself and becomes Deathstroke once more.

=== The New 52 ===
In 2011, "The New 52" rebooted the DC universe. Deathstroke is known as a top mercenary around the world. Deathstroke is hired by a man named Cristoph for a mission that forces him to work with a team of younger mercenaries known as the Alpha Dogs. Their target is Jeffrey Bode, an arms dealer traveling on a plane. After discovering that the weapons Bode is trafficking are clones of the villain Clayface, Deathstroke and the other mercenaries are able to dispatch them, killing Bode in the process and retrieving a suitcase he had in his possession. Deathstroke subsequently betrays and kills the Alpha Dogs, enraged by the notion that his employers feel that he is unable to accomplish his tasks alone. Deathstroke then begins to take on increasingly dangerous missions in an effort to prove his worth, but is also spurred on by the contents of the suitcase he retrieved from Bode – namely the mask and knife belonging to his son Grant, both of which were stained with fresh blood, indicating that he may be still alive. During this time, Deathstroke is pursued by a new villain known as Legacy. Deathstroke kills Legacy, but another Legacy, donning the same colors as the last one, appears again and again. It turns out the parents of one of the Alpha Dog members have hired multiple mercenaries to kill Deathstroke, all donning the green and purple color, to get revenge on him. Deathstroke tracks them down, but is confronted by his son Grant. It is revealed that all of this has been a plot to lure Deathstroke to him. Although Deathstroke manages to kill both the parents, Grant defeats him, claiming superiority over Deathstroke. Grant is about to finish Slade, but he hesitates, and leaves. Recovering from his injuries, Grant takes another contract, Slade is happy that his son has become a better warrior than him, and then visits his father's hospital bed to mention that he has grown up to be a greater man than him.

==== Origins ====
Deathstroke's altered origin is introduced in Deathstroke (vol. 2) #0. The fact that he participated in the military at 16 and met Adeline has not changed. Already a legend in the army, Slade was drafted into Team 7 and went on many missions. In one mission, Slade was gravely injured and had to undergo an operation that enhanced his abilities, making him virtually a superhuman. After this, he married Adeline and had two sons, Grant and Joseph. Around this time, Slade received intel that his best friend, Wintergreen, was caught in Somalia. He donned a mask and flew to Somalia to rescue Wintergreen, slaughtering all the captors. As his fame grew, his enemies did too. An attack targeting his house seemingly killed Joseph and Adeline. With evidence that the attack was from North Korea, Slade killed a group of North Korean soldiers, but lost his right eye in the process. It is later shown that Joseph and Adeline are still alive.

This origin was again changed in Teen Titans: Deathstroke #1. After a mission that involved destroying a children's hospital which Slade was unaware of, he quit the army. After Team 7's termination, Slade started to operate under the Deathstroke identity. He took Grant on his mission, considering him as not only his son, but as a business partner, and the only person he could trust. During a mission in North Korea, their refuge was infiltrated and North Korean soldiers barged in, firing into the house. Grant was shot, and as Slade looked back at his son, a bullet penetrated his right eye, blinding it. Enraged, Slade went on a massacre and killed the soldiers. However, Grant was presumed dead.

=== DC Rebirth ===
"DC Rebirth" is a comic book publishing initiative launched by DC Comics in May 2016. It was designed to be a relaunch of the entire DC Comics line, following the conclusion of the "New 52" era that began in 2011. DC Rebirth aimed to bring back many of the classic elements and characters that had been missing or altered during the New 52 era, while also introducing new storylines and characters. The initiative featured a mix of ongoing series and limited series, with some series continuing from the New 52 era and others starting fresh with new creative teams.

Deathstroke stars in an ongoing series about his exploits as a mercenary and his tumultuous relationship with his ex-wife and children as well introducing Hosun Park, Slade's son-in-law and hacker. During one such operation, he comes into contract with the Red Lion/Matthew Bland, the dictator of the African nation of Buredunia. Bland offers him a high sum for making sure his competition does not bring in US forces, and later takes one of Slade's Promethium suits for himself. Later, Slade attempts to save his son Grant from dying in battle with the Teen Titans by using Speed Force energy drained from Kid Flash (Ace West) to time travel. He becomes trapped in the Speed Force in the process, but is rescued by the Titans and Teen Titans. The experience moves him to give up being Deathstroke, so he builds a team of heroes called Defiance, with both his children, Wintergreen, Adeline Kane, and Ace as his teammates. It was later disbanded after Power Girl took her own life, and Slade's attempts have grown worse to himself.

Deathstroke was later imprisoned in Arkham Asylum, though he escapes and is later captured by Damian Wayne's new roster of Teen Titans. In a bid to fulfill his death-wish, he releases all the inmates that Robin had been locking up illegally to attack the group. He tried to goad Damian into killing him, but he was instead killed by Red Arrow. Shortly afterwards, a funeral was held by all the villains. At his funeral, Raptor gave Slade's body leprosy, which sent his healing ability into overdrive and resurrected him. He took his resurrection as a second chance in life and went into hiding as a doctor.

=== Infinite Frontier ===
Deathstroke teamed up with Black Canary to work with an organization called T.R.U.S.T. They both realized that the organization was led by Secret Society of Super Villains and Deathstroke kicks Black Canary out to take control of it, naming it Deathstroke Inc. He meets Rose Wilson and Respawn, a boy made from his and Talia's DNA who resembled Damian Wayne. He was framed for Ra's al Ghul's murder by Geo-Force who wanted revenge on Talia and Deathstroke. During the conflict, Deathstroke is killed by Talia, but is resurrected by his followers using a Lazarus Pit.

== Characterization ==
Christopher Priest, the writer of Deathstroke's self-titled solo series in DC Rebirth, has said:

[N]ot only was Marv's Deathstroke a villain, he was also kind of an asshole, which I thought was unique. He wasn't some misunderstood anarchist; he deliberately did skeevy things – most notably sleeping with Terra, a presumably underage girl – in his quest to exact revenge against his enemies. I read that and went, "Whoa". This was beyond The Joker, well beyond Lex Luthor. Marv created the first modern supervillain. He broke every rule by making Deathstroke three-dimensional and giving him internal conflicts while maintaining a level of skeeve we weren't used to seeing from a typical 2-dimensional bad guy.

Deathstroke is widely regarded as one of the most feared and deadly professional assassins in the world with a considerable seven figure fee and a six figure deposit. He is infamous for completing nearly all of his contracts, having only failed his contract with H.I.V.E. to kill the Teen Titans. He uses his resources to hire lawyers to prevent law enforcement from proving that Slade Wilson and Deathstroke are the same person. Deathstroke has been described as being emotionally crippled, believing everyone else to be "idiots" and struggling to commit despite desperately loving his children and desiring closeness with them. He is a poor father and often suffers from past choices made between his children and wife, Adeline.

=== Powers and abilities ===
Slade Wilson was given an experimental super-soldier serum that increased his physical and mental abilities to superhuman levels, granting him enhanced strength, speed, stamina, agility, durability, reflexes, and senses. Deathstroke also possesses a healing factor that allows him to recover from injuries at an accelerated rate. Despite stating that he can only heal non-fatal injuries, he has shown to heal from severe organ trauma such as impalement and bullet wounds to the brain. These regenerative abilities have given him a slowed aging process and extended longevity, in addition to a resistance to toxins. While Deathstroke was originally stated to be able to use up to 90% of his brain's capacity, it was later clarified that his brain processes information nine times more efficiently than an ordinary human's. Deathstroke also has an eidetic memory and has been described as a tactical genius with a strategic mind rivaling that of Batman.

Even prior to acquiring his powers, Deathstroke mastered numerous hand-to-hand combat and martial art forms as well as swordsmanship and marksmanship as part of his elite training in the military. His arsenal of weapons include various swords, firearms, knives, and a ballistic staff capable of firing bolts of energy from each end.

== Other versions ==
Several alternate versions of Deathstroke have appeared throughout the character's publication history, primarily in series set in alternate universes.

- In Just Imagine...., a series conceptualized by Stan Lee, Deathstroke is Deke Durgan, a member of the Doom Patrol who possesses a fatal touch.
- In the Amalgam Comics universe, Dare the Terminator and X-Stroke the Eliminator are composite characters combining elements of Deathstroke with Marvel Comics characters Daredevil and X-Cutioner respectively.
- In the Tangent Comics imprint, a series based on completely reimagining characters, Deathstroke is a member of the Fatal Five.
- In the Flashpoint universe, Deathstroke is a pirate alongside his daughter Rose.
- In the Absolute Universe, General Slade Wilson is a cyborg who works for Jack Grimm and later becomes the head of his Robin task force.

== Collected editions ==
Title	Material collected	Pages	Publication date	ISBN
Deathstroke, The Terminator
Deathstroke, The Terminator Vol. 1: Assassins	Deathstroke, the Terminator #1–9, New Titans #70	264	November 2014	978-1401254285
Deathstroke, The Terminator Vol. 2: Sympathy For The Devil	Deathstroke, the Terminator #10–13, Annual #1, Superman Vol. 2 #68	272	November 2015	978-1401258429
Deathstroke, The Terminator Vol. 3: Nuclear Winter	Deathstroke, the Terminator #14–20, Showcase '93 #6–11	312	August 2016	978-1401260767
Deathstroke, The Terminator Vol. 4: Crash or Burn	Deathstroke, the Terminator #21–25, Annual #2	312	April 2017	978-1401270834
Deathstroke, The Terminator Vol. 5: World Tour	Deathstroke, the Terminator #26–34	336	July 2018	978-1401285753
The New 52
Deathstroke Vol. 1: Legacy	Deathstroke Vol. 2 #1–8	192	August 2012	978-1-401234-81-2
Deathstroke Vol. 2: Lobo Hunt	Deathstroke Vol. 2 #0, #9–20	240	August 2013	
Deathstroke Vol. 1: Gods of War	Deathstroke Vol. 3 #1–6	144	July 2015	978-1401254711
Deathstroke Vol. 2: God Killer	Deathstroke Vol. 3 #7–10, Annual #1, Sneak Preview from Convergence: Batman: Shadow of the Bat #2	144	April 2016	978-1401261207
Deathstroke Vol. 3: Suicide Run	Deathstroke Vol. 3 #11–16	144	October 2016	978-1401264550
Deathstroke Vol. 4: Family Business	Deathstroke Vol. 3 #17–20, Annual #2	144	August 2017	978-1401267940
DC Rebirth
Deathstroke Vol. 1: The Professional	Deathstroke: Rebirth #1, Deathstroke Vol. 4 #1–5	144	January 2017	978-1401268237
Deathstroke Vol. 2: The Gospel of Slade	Deathstroke Vol. 4 #6–11	144	May 2017	978-1401270988
Deathstroke Vol. 3: Twilight	Deathstroke Vol. 4 #12–18	168	October 2017	978-1401274061
Titans: The Lazarus Contract	Deathstroke Vol. 4 #19-20, Titans Vol. 3 #11, Teen Titans Vol. 6 #8, Teen Titans: The Lazarus Contract Special #1	128	October 2017	978-1401276508
Deathstroke Vol. 4: Defiance	Deathstroke Vol. 4 #21–25	128	April 2018	978-1401275471
Deathstroke Vol. 5: Fall of Slade	Deathstroke Vol. 4 #26–29 and Annual #1	144	August 2018	978-1401278335
Batman vs. Deathstroke	Deathstroke Vol. 4 #30–35	160	November 2018	978-1401285890
Deathstroke Vol. 6: Arkham	Deathstroke Vol. 4 #36-40	144	May 2019	978-1401294311
Teen Titans/Deathstroke: The Terminus Agenda	Deathstroke Vol. 4 #41–43, Teen Titans Vol. 6 #28-30	144	September 2019	978-1401299651
Deathstroke: R.I.P.	Deathstroke Vol. 4 #44–50	288	February 2020	978-1779502759
Deathstroke by Christopher Priest Omnibus	Deathstroke: Rebirth #1, Deathstroke #1-50, Deathstroke Annual #1, DC Holiday Special 2017 #1, Titans #11, Teen Titans #8, 28-30, and Titans: The Lazarus Contract Special #1.	1392	October 2021	978-1779512604
Infinite Frontier
Deathstroke Inc. Vol. 1: King of the Supervillains	Deathstroke Inc. #1-7 and a story from Batman: Urban Legends #6	208	May 2022	978-1779516572
Deathstroke Inc. Vol. 2: Year One	Deathstroke Inc. #10-15	206	March 2023	978-1779519825
Batman: Shadow War	Shadow War: Alpha #1, Batman #122-123, Deathstroke Inc. #8-9, Robin #13-14, Shadow War Zone #1, and Shadow War: Omega #1	256	November 2022	978-1401254285

== In other media ==
=== Television ===
==== Live-action ====
Manu Bennett (left) and Esai Morales (right) as Slade Wilson / Deathstroke in Arrow and Titans, respectively
- An original incarnation of Deathstroke named Earl Gregg appears in the Lois & Clark: The New Adventures of Superman episode "Bob and Carol and Lois and Clark", portrayed by Antonio Sabàto Jr. This version, also known as Bob Stanford, is an assassin with magnetic powers.
- Slade Wilson appears in the tenth season of Smallville, portrayed by Michael Hogan. This version is a corrupt U.S. Army general responsible for the Vigilante Registration Act who loses his right eye and acquires a healing factor from Darkseid that puts him "beyond death's stroke".
- Various characters adopt the Deathstroke persona in Arrow.
  - Bill "Billy" Wintergreen (portrayed by Jeffrey C. Robinson) is Slade Wilson's former friend and ASIS partner who joins Edward Fyers' mercenaries.
  - Slade Wilson (portrayed by Manu Bennett) is a former ASIS agent and Oliver Queen's mentor on Lian Yu who is injected with the "Mirakuru" super-soldier serum, which drives him insane and causes him to blame Oliver for the death of Shado, the woman he loved, forcing Oliver to drive an arrow through his right eye. In the second season, Slade resurfaces as the mercenary "Deathstroke" and attempts to destroy Oliver's life by killing Moira Queen and using a Mirakuru-enhanced army to besiege Starling City. Although he is defeated and incarcerated in an A.R.G.U.S. prison on Lian Yu, Slade makes minor appearances in subsequent seasons.
  - Grant Wilson (portrayed by Jamie Andrew Cutler), Slade's youngest son, continues his father's legacy by forming the Deathstroke Gang. A possible future version of Grant from 2046 also appears in the spin-off series Legends of Tomorrow.
  - Joe Wilson (portrayed by Liam Hall), Slade's eldest son, dons his father's armor during the "Elseworlds" crossover event.
  - John Diggle Jr. (portrayed by Charlie Barnett) becomes the new leader of the Deathstroke Gang in the year 2040.
- Slade Wilson / Deathstroke appears in the second season of Titans, portrayed by Esai Morales. This version is a former Delta Force operator who underwent experimental bio-enhancements at H.I.V.E. Slade's feud with the Titans began when he killed Garth, causing their leader Dick Grayson to reveal Slade's occupation as an assassin to his son Jericho. Blaming the Titans for tearing his family apart, Slade attempts to seek revenge by planting his illegitimate daughter Rose into their ranks, but Rose ultimately betrays and stabs him after joining the Titans. A zombified version of Deathstroke briefly appears in the fourth season.

==== Animation ====
Slade in Teen Titans

- Deathstroke, referred to simply as Slade, appears in Teen Titans, voiced by Ron Perlman. This version is an enigmatic criminal mastermind with an army of robotic henchmen who seeks to kill the Teen Titans, conquer Jump City, and turn Robin and later Terra into his apprentice. Though Terra sacrifices herself to kill him and save the Titans, Slade is resurrected as an undead, pyrokinetic being by Trigon before regaining his mortality after he temporarily joins forces with the Titans to defeat Trigon.
- Deathstroke appears in the Robot Chicken DC Comics Special as a member of the Legion of Doom.
- Deathstroke appears in Young Justice, voiced initially by Wentworth Miller in the episode "The Fix" and subsequently by Fred Tatasciore. Introduced in the second season, this version initially serves as an enforcer for the Light, before replacing Ra's al Ghul as one of its council members and the leader of the League of Shadows in the third season.
- Deathstroke appears in Beware the Batman, voiced by Robin Atkin Downes. This version is a former CIA agent who was terminated by his mentor Alfred Pennyworth. Deathstroke poses as "Dane Lisslow" to seek revenge against Pennyworth and his new protégé Batman, but loses his right eye during their final battle.
- Deathstroke, referred to simply as Slade, makes cameo appearances in Teen Titans Go!, voiced by Khary Payton in the episode "The Cape".
- Deathstroke appears in the DC Super Hero Girls episode "#DinnerForFive", voiced by D. C. Douglas.
- Deathstroke appears in Deathstroke: Knights & Dragons, voiced by Michael Chiklis. The series was later released direct-to-video as Deathstroke: Knights & Dragons: The Movie.
- Slade Wilson appears in My Adventures with Superman, voiced by Chris Parnell. This version is a member of Task Force X who loses his right eye to Livewire and later joins LexCorp at the end of the second season. In the third season, Wilson and Luthor save Hank Henshaw, who was injured during Brainiac's invasion, and turn him into Cyborg Superman. After Luthor's second creation as the Eradicator, Wilson has doubts about Luthor causing chaos, turning his back on him, and he teams up again with Amanda Waller to face the Eradicator.
  - A potential future version of Wilson appears in the episode "The Death of Superman".

=== Film ===
==== Live-action ====
Joe Manganiello as Slade Wilson / Deathstroke in Justice League

- Slade Wilson / Deathstroke appears in the DC Extended Universe (DCEU), portrayed by Joe Manganiello. In the post-credits scene of Justice League, he is recruited by Lex Luthor to form their own team in response to the Justice League's formation. In the director's cut of the film, Zack Snyder's Justice League, Deathstroke learns of Batman's secret identity from Luthor, and a possible future version of the character also appears in an apocalyptic dream. Manganiello was originally slated to reprise the role in The Batman and a Deathstroke origin film, but these projects were removed from the DCEU's continuity and canceled, respectively.
- Deathstroke will appear in the rebooted DC Universe (DCU) franchise. A film co-starring Deathstroke and Bane was reported to be in development from a screenplay by Matthew Orton in September 2024.

==== Animation ====
- An alternate universe version of Slade Wilson appears in Justice League: Crisis on Two Earths, voiced by Bruce Davison. This version is the President of the United States from Earth-3 who is missing his left eye.
- Deathstroke appears in Lego DC Comics Super Heroes: Justice League vs. Bizarro League, voiced by John DiMaggio.
- Deathstroke appears in Lego DC Comics Super Heroes: Justice League - Attack of the Legion of Doom.
- Deathstroke appears in Lego DC Comics Super Heroes: Justice League: Gotham City Breakout, voiced again by John DiMaggio.
- Deathstroke appears in Lego DC Comics Super Heroes: The Flash (2018).
- A Feudal Japan-inspired incarnation of Deathstroke appears in Batman Ninja, voiced by Junichi Suwabe in the Japanese version and again by Fred Tatasciore in the English dub.
- Deathstroke, referred to simply as Slade, appears in Teen Titans Go! To the Movies, voiced by Will Arnett. Throughout the film, he masquerades as filmmaker Jade Wilson (voiced by Kristen Bell).

===== DC Animated Movie Universe =====
- The "Flashpoint" incarnation of Deathstroke appears in Justice League: The Flashpoint Paradox, voiced again by Ron Perlman. This version is the captain of a ship called the Ravager. He and Lex Luthor attempt to locate Aquaman's doomsday device, but are ambushed and killed by Atlantean forces.
- Deathstroke appears in Son of Batman, voiced by Thomas Gibson. This version is a former member of the League of Assassins who stages a coup d'état to kill Ra's al Ghul, although his right eye is gouged out by Robin. Deathstroke later attempts to genetically transform the League's members into an army of Man-Bat ninja warriors, but is foiled by Batman and Robin.
- Deathstroke appears in Teen Titans: The Judas Contract, voiced by Miguel Ferrer. After rejuvenating himself in a Lazarus Pit, he is hired by Brother Blood to capture the Teen Titans and manipulates his juvenile lover Terra into joining their ranks as a double-agent. Deathstroke fights Nightwing and Robin until an enraged Terra traps him in Blood's collapsing lair.
- Deathstroke makes a cameo appearance in a flashback in Suicide Squad: Hell to Pay.

=== Video games ===
- Deathstroke, referred to simply as Slade, appears as the final boss and a playable character in Teen Titans (2006), voiced again by Ron Perlman.
- Deathstroke appears as a playable character in Mortal Kombat vs. DC Universe, voiced by Patrick Seitz and motion-captured by Chris Matthews.
- Deathstroke appears in DC Universe Online, voiced by Tracy Bush. This version is a member of the Secret Society.
- Deathstroke appears as a playable character in Injustice: Gods Among Us, voiced by J. G. Hertzler. Additionally, an alternate universe version of Deathstroke is featured as a member of the Insurgency.
- Deathstroke appears in Scribblenauts Unmasked: A DC Comics Adventure.
- Deathstroke appears as a playable outfit in Fortnite Battle Royale.
- Deathstroke appears in DC Battle Arena, voiced by P.M. Seymour.
- Deathstroke appears in Lego Batman: Legacy of the Dark Knight.

==== Batman: Arkham ====
Deathstroke in Batman: Arkham Origins

- Deathstroke appears in Batman: Arkham City Lockdown, voiced by Larry Grimm.
- Deathstroke appears as a boss and a downloadable playable character in Batman: Arkham Origins, voiced by Mark Rolston.
- Deathstroke appears as a boss in Batman: Arkham Knight, voiced again by Mark Rolston.
- Deathstroke appears as a downloadable playable character in Suicide Squad: Kill the Justice League, voiced by Glenn Wrage.
- Deathstroke appears in Batman: Arkham Shadow, voiced again by Mark Rolston.

==== Lego ====
- Deathstroke appears as a playable character in the Nintendo 3DS version of Lego Batman 2: DC Super Heroes.
- Deathstroke appears as a playable character in Lego Batman 3: Beyond Gotham, voiced by Liam O'Brien.
- Deathstroke appears as a playable character in Lego DC Super-Villains, voiced again by Mark Rolston.
- Deathstroke appears in Lego Batman: Legacy of the Dark Knight, voiced by Rich Keeble.

=== Miscellaneous ===
- Deathstroke, referred to simply as Slade, appears in Teen Titans Go! (2004).
- The Injustice incarnation of Deathstroke appears in the Injustice: Gods Among Us prequel comic.
- A DC Animated Universe (DCAU)-inspired incarnation of Deathstroke appears in Batman: The Adventures Continue.
