= Wintergreen (comics) =

Publication information
- Publisher: DC Comics
- First appearance: The New Teen Titans #2 (December 1980)
- Created by: Marv Wolfman; George Perez

In-story information
- Alter ego: William Randolph Wintergreen
- Team affiliations: Deathstroke; Black Lantern Corps
- Notable aliases: W.R. Wintergreen
- Abilities: Master combatant; Skilled tactician; Aviation; Bi-lingual

William Randolph Wintergreen is a fictional character appearing in comic books published by DC Comics, often depicted as an associate of Slade Wilson (the supervillain Deathstroke). Although Wintergreen lacks Slade's superhuman physical attributes, he possesses far more combat experience and thus acts as Wilson's mentor.

A re-imagined version of the character appeared on The CW's live-action television series Arrow, portrayed by stunt performer Jeffrey C. Robinson and depicted as the first incarnation of Deathstroke. Wintergreen also appears in the DC Universe series Titans, portrayed by Demore Barnes.

== Publication history ==
Wintergreen was created by George Pérez and Marv Wolfman, and first appeared in The New Teen Titans #2 (December 1980).

== Fictional character biography ==
William Wintergreen grew up in Oxford, England. At university, he avoided sports and secluded himself in the school library, which was open to him due to his father's title. Wintergreen met Sergeant Slade Wilson during his time at the British Army, and the two developed a close friendship. When General Sampson sent Slade on a suicide mission, Wintergreen rescued Slade from dying in an explosion. Holding a grudge for Wintergreen's disobedience, Sampson sent him on a suicide mission. Slade commandeered a plane and made his way to Hanoi, where he freed Wintergreen from a Viet Cong prison. Slade was subsequently discharged for disobeying orders to save Wintergreen. Following his discharge, Slade secretly begins operating as the mercenary Deathstroke, with Wintergreen becoming his butler and mentor.

During the Titans Hunt storyline, Slade is forced to kill his son Joseph after he is possessed and corrupted by the spirits of Azarath. Joseph is later revealed to have survived by transferring his consciousness into Slade's body. Under Joseph's control, Slade kills Wintergreen and mounts his severed head on a wall.

During the Blackest Night storyline, Wintergreen is temporarily resurrected as a Black Lantern and attacks Deathstroke alongside Adeline Kane, Grant Wilson, and Bill Walsh. He is permanently resurrected following The New 52 relaunch, which rebooted the continuity of the DC Comics universe.

== Powers and abilities ==
Wintergreen has received extensive training in military protocols and espionage, making him a proficient hand-to-hand combatant and martial artist. He has also proven an exceptionally skilled marksman in the use of various firearms.

== In other media ==
=== Television ===
Concept artwork of Billy Wintergreen / Deathstroke for the first season of Arrow

- Wintergreen makes non-speaking appearances in Teen Titans.
- A character based on William Wintergreen named Bill "Billy" Wintergreen appears in Arrow, portrayed by Jeffrey C. Robinson. This version is a former member of an elite division of the Australian Secret Intelligence Service (ASIS) under the codename "Bishop", friend of Slade Wilson, godfather of Slade's son Joe Wilson, a skilled swordsman and hand-to-hand combatant, and the first individual to utilize the Deathstroke persona. In flashbacks depicted in the first season, Wintergreen and Slade were sent to the island of Lian Yu to rescue Chinese army deserter Yao Fei from a group of terrorists led by Edward Fyers. Wintergreen defected to Fyers' side and abandoned Slade, only to be killed by him.
- Wintergreen appears in Titans, portrayed by Demore Barnes. This version is African-American, previously served with Delta Force before joining H.I.V.E., and served as Deathstroke's handler while he was with the organization.

=== Video games ===
Wintergreen appears as a character summon in Scribblenauts Unmasked: A DC Comics Adventure.

=== Miscellaneous ===
Wintergreen appears in Deathstroke: Knights & Dragons, voiced by Colin Salmon. This version is a Black British former MI6 agent.

=== Merchandise ===
The Arrow incarnation of Billy Wintergreen / Deathstroke received a 6.75-inch action figure from DC Collectibles as part of a two-pack with Oliver Queen.
