= Jericho (DC Comics) =

Fictional comics character

- Jericho as depicted in Tales of the Teen Titans #44 (July 1984). Art by George Pérez.

Publication information
- Publisher: DC Comics
- First appearance: Tales of the Teen Titans #43 (June 1984)
- Created by: Marv Wolfman; George Pérez

In-story information
- Alter ego: Joseph William Wilson
- Species: Metahuman
- Team affiliations: Teen Titans; Wildebeest Society
- Abilities: Motor function control of others through eye contact; Possession; Mind control; Astral projection; Telepathy; "Soul-self" ("Titans Hunt" storyline); Skilled in hand-to-hand combat

Jericho (Joseph William Wilson) is a fictional character appearing in comic books published by DC Comics. The character created by Marv Wolfman and George Pérez and first appeared in the 1984 series The New Teen Titans. Jericho is the son of Teen Titans adversary Deathstroke (Slade Wilson) and has the ability to possess the bodies of others via eye contact. At a young age, Jericho was kidnapped by enemies of Slade and had his throat slit, leaving him mute. Jericho communicated with sign language for the majority of his publication history; in the DC Rebirth continuity, he also uses technology that vocalizes his thoughts.

Jericho was first adapted to television in the fifth season of the animated series Teen Titans, where he appeared as part of the Teen Titans' expanded roster. Joe Wilson going by the name "Kane Wolfman" appeared as a recurring character on the sixth and seventh seasons of The CW Arrowverse show Arrow, portrayed by Liam Hall. He also appeared as a recurring character on the second season of the DC Universe series Titans, portrayed by Chella Man.

== Publication history ==
Jericho first appeared in Tales of the Teen Titans #43, during the storyline "The Judas Contract". He was created by Marv Wolfman and George Pérez.

Jericho was created in the early 1980s, a few years after Wolfman and Pérez relaunched the Teen Titans series and turned it into a major hit for DC Comics. At the time, Wolfman and Pérez were interested in distancing the team from the Justice League, many of whose members had been mentors to the Titans. This meant introducing new characters such as Raven and Cyborg, as well as changing some of the existing characters, such as having Dick Grayson trade in his identity as Robin in favor of becoming Nightwing. Jericho was part of this process of establishing the team as its own feature rather than, in Pérez' words, a "Justice Little League". Wolfman had decided on the name, which he got from an unused story from the previous Titans series, and with the idea of Jericho being the son of Deathstroke, but could not think of any other aspects of the character. Pérez worked out the design, powers, and personality of Jericho and also suggested making the character mute. He also insisted that Jericho's emotions be conveyed entirely through visuals, without the use of thought balloons. Pérez claimed that Jericho is the first character which he created by himself.

When Wolfman and Pérez were creating the character, they considered making Jericho gay. Pérez stated that "while Marv and I did discuss the possibility of Joseph Wilson being gay, Marv decided that it was too much of a stereotype to have the sensitive, artistic, and wide-eyed character with arguably effeminate features be also homosexual". It is eventually revealed that he is not interested in women, saying in sign language to Kole, who was in love with him, that he is gay in Convergence, which was confirmed by artist Nicola Scott. The DC Rebirth version of Jericho is depicted as bisexual.

== Fictional character biography ==
The New Titans #83 (1992), the final appearance of Jericho with his original appearance. The character returned eleven years later with a new look.

Joseph Wilson is the youngest son of Slade Wilson (Deathstroke) and Adeline Kane. As a child, he is captured by Jackal under the orders of Quraci president Hurrambi Marlo in retaliation for Deathstroke killing an important colonel. One of Jackal's men slits Joseph's throat, leaving him mute. Following this incident, Adeline divorces Slade and takes custody of Joseph and his older brother Grant. While still a child, Jericho discovers that he possesses the metahuman ability to take possession of any humanoid being by making eye contact with them, a result of biological experimentation done on his father years before.

Joseph is introduced in the storyline "The Judas Contract" (1984), where he assists Dick Grayson in rescuing the Teen Titans after they are captured by Deathstroke. The rescue mission is a success, but the Titans are initially wary of Jericho because of his relationship to Deathstroke and the betrayal of Terra, a member of the Titans who was secretly working with Deathstroke and helped him capture the Titans.

After some time with the Titans, Jericho turns against them in the storyline "Titans Hunt" (1990-1992), where he is possessed by the corrupted souls of Azarath and takes control of the Wildebeest Society. Jericho captures the Titans and attempts to use them as host bodies for the souls, but is killed by Deathstroke. The Wildebeest Society's experiments lead to the creation of Baby Wildebeest, who joins the Titans following Jericho's death.

In the 2003 series Teen Titans, Jericho is revealed to have survived by possessing Deathstroke, but his consciousness was left dormant for years. Jericho's consciousness is later transferred into a reconstructed version of his original body created by Raven, who heals him of the throat injuries from his childhood that left him mute. Jericho rejoins the Teen Titans and reconnects with Rose.

=== The New 52 ===
In The New 52 continuity reboot, two versions of Jericho appear. Unlike previous comics, Jericho is not initially depicted as mute.

The first version appears as an antagonist in the second volume of Deathstroke. He and his mother were believed to have died when North Korean forces attacked their home. Now a young adult, Jericho plans to destroy his father's life that he had built for himself with the help of his mother and brother. It is later revealed that Jericho had taken control of his mother and brother and forced them to hate Deathstroke.

The second version appears in the third volume of Deathstroke, which erases the previous volume from continuity and brings Jericho closer to his original depiction. Sometime later in Gotham City, Jericho meets with Rose, but his father Charles Wilson, also known as Odysseus, appears to reclaim him. Due to the arrival of Deathstroke, Jericho escapes his grandfather's clutches and once again secludes himself. Sometime later, it is revealed that Jericho went to Ra's al Ghul to seek sanctuary and had gained better control of his powers.

=== DC Rebirth ===
Jericho is reintroduced after the "DC Rebirth" relaunch, once again mute and with his origin restored, though slightly modernized. This version of Jericho is also bisexual. Unlike his blissful childhood in the original comics, Jericho's family life was strained by the time he was a young teenager, as his parents were constantly fighting over his father's long absences due to his work with the government.

As a young adult, Jericho is working as an executive vice-president for a tech firm that his mother owns in Los Angeles and is engaged to his interpreter, Etienne. In addition to sign language, Jericho uses technology that vocalizes his thoughts. After Rose comes to visit him, Jericho secretly meets with David Isherwood, his former lover and Slade's weapon designer. Jericho tells Isherwood of his marriage, which he disapproves of. Rose later learns that Etienne is secretly a member of H.I.V.E. and kills her on the day of her wedding to Jericho.

== Powers and abilities ==
Jericho is a metahuman with the ability to possess others by making eye contact with them; his body turns insubstantial and enters the subject's body. While he is in possession, Jericho has access to all of his host's powers and memories. Jericho's victim remains conscious and can express themselves vocally, but they are otherwise unable to control their body's actions while possessed. Jericho sometimes uses the American manual alphabet letter "J" as his sign name to signal to his allies that he has taken possession of a person.

Despite his pacifistic nature and dislike for physical violence, he is also skilled in hand-to-hand combat and able to hold his own against his father, Deathstroke.

When possessed by the spirits of Azarath, Jericho had a powerful lion soul self and a healing factor.

=== Powers and abilities in The New 52 ===
In The New 52, Jericho possesses an array of psychic abilities aside from his possession powers, such as being able to telepathically control his brother Grant and his mother Adeline.

Despite conflicting continuity between the second and third volumes of Deathstroke, Jericho retains his telepathy to read minds and control others. After being experimented on, Jericho demonstrates even more powerful abilities, being able to rupture humans apart with a psychic blast. Although his telepathy can be blocked by others with mental powers, Jericho can read their aura to see if they hold malicious intent and can also project a defensive energy field.

=== Powers and abilities in DC Rebirth ===
In DC Rebirth, Jericho demonstrates the ability to separate his incorporeal, spiritual self from his physical body when he uses his powers to possess other people. Unlike his usual way of possessing others, Jericho describes this ability as akin to near-field communication, being able to overshadow people within a certain distance from him. When Jericho projects his consciousness, his body is left dormant and immobile, leaving it vulnerable.

== Other versions ==
- An alternate universe version of Jericho appears in Tiny Titans.
- An alternate universe version of Jericho appears in Teen Titans: Earth One. This version was manipulated and brainwashed by Elinore Stone of S.T.A.R. Labs into spying and fighting against his fellow "Project Titans" members.

== In other media ==
=== Television ===
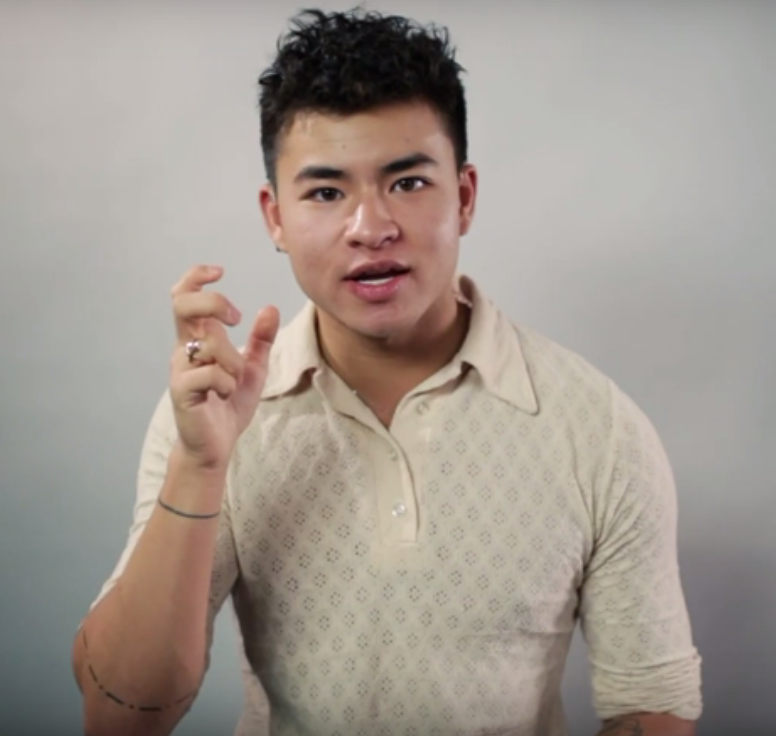
Chella Man portrays Jericho in the second season of Titans.

- Jericho appears in Teen Titans. This version is an honorary member of the eponymous team.
- Joe Wilson appears in media set in the Arrowverse, portrayed by Liam Hall as an adult and William Franklyn-Miller as a child.
  - Primarily appearing in Arrow, this version has a more violent personality, plays a villainous role akin to his brother Grant Wilson, is the god-son of Billy Wintergreen, and is not mute. In flashbacks depicted in the sixth season, Joe followed in Wintergreen and his father Slade Wilson's footsteps and joined the Australian Secret Intelligence Service (ASIS). After Slade returned from a mission on Lian Yu, he and Joe worked with each other for some time until Slade massacred their comrades in a Mirakuru serum-induced frenzy and left to seek revenge on Oliver Queen. Following this, Joe became a criminal and traveled to Kasnia, where he rejected his birth name, took the alias Kane Wolfman, was taken prisoner by the local government, and joined a criminal organization called the Jackals, eventually becoming their leader. In the present, a cured Slade and Queen travel to Kasnia to find Joe, believing he is still imprisoned before discovering what happened afterward. Joe attempts to force Slade to kill Queen, but his father refuses and fights him and the Jackals instead. While escaping, Joe reveals Slade has another son named Grant and that their mother kept him secret from Slade. In the seventh season, Joe assumes Slade's Deathstroke suit, travels to Star City, and fights A.R.G.U.S. agents until he is apprehended by Oliver, the Flash, and Supergirl. After being taken into A.R.G.U.S.'s custody, Joe is recruited into the "Ghost Initiative".
  - Joe makes a cameo appearance in the crossover "Elseworlds" as a Central City Police Department police officer in an altered reality created by John Deegan.
- Jericho appears in Titans, portrayed by Chella Man. This version is the oldest child of Deathstroke who was rendered mute after enemies of Deathstroke's threatened Jericho to reach him, after which Jericho's overprotective mother Adeline took him and left Deathstroke. Five years prior, despite living away from his father and being unaware of his mercenary work, Jericho admired him. Seeking to exploit this, Deathstroke's enemy Dick Grayson befriends Jericho, invited him to join the Titans, and revealed the truth about his father. Uncertain about this, Jericho locates his father in the hopes of learning his side of the story, only to get caught in a fight between Deathstroke and Grayson, during which Jericho sacrificed himself to save the latter. While his body died, Jericho's spirit became trapped in Deathstroke's body for the next four years until his sister Rose Wilson grievously injures Deathstroke, causing Jericho's spirit to jump to her body.

=== Film ===
- Jericho makes a non-speaking appearance in Teen Titans: The Judas Contract as a test subject of Brother Blood.
- Jericho appears in Deathstroke: Knights & Dragons: The Movie, voiced by Griffin Puatu as a teenager and Asher Bishop as a child. Seeking revenge on his absentee father Slade Wilson, a conflicted Jericho joins his sister Rose Wilson and H.I.V.E. to take over the world before reconciling with his parents.

=== Video games ===
- Jericho appears in DC Universe Online as part of the "Teen Titans: The Judas Contract" DLC. This version is an associate of the Teen Titans.
- Jericho appears as a character summon in Scribblenauts Unmasked: A DC Comics Adventure.
- Jericho appears as a playable character in DC Legends.

=== Miscellaneous ===
- Jericho appears in Teen Titans Go!.
- The Arrow incarnation of Joe Wilson appears in the non-canonical tie-in novel Arrow: Vengeance. In this version of events, following Slade Wilson's return from Lian Yu, he abused ASIS resources to find Oliver Queen. When his superior Wade DeFarge discovered this, Slade attempted to kill him, but Joe and his mother Addie were killed in the crossfire.
- Joseph Wilson / Jericho appears in Deathstroke: Knights & Dragons, voiced by Griffin Puatu as a teenager and Asher Bishop as a child. This version is the only son of Slade and Adeline who shares a close relationship with the former. Additionally, he was rendered mute after H.I.V.E. took him hostage to coerce Slade to join them and Joseph's throat was slit. Following this, Slade left him and Adeline, who sent Joseph to a private boarding school in Switzerland. The isolation and trauma left the now teenage Joseph angry and resentful as he was forced to address his burgeoning and unstable psionic powers alone, which cause him to enter a trance-like state and become more violent due to his lack of control over them.
