= Titans (2018 TV series) =

American superhero television series

- Genre: Action-adventure; Drama; Science fantasy; Superhero
- Based on: Teen Titans by: Bob Haney; Bruno Premiani
- Developed by: Akiva Goldsman; Geoff Johns; Greg Berlanti
- Showrunner: Greg Walker
- Starring: Brenton Thwaites; Anna Diop; Teagan Croft; Ryan Potter; Curran Walters; Conor Leslie; Minka Kelly; Alan Ritchson; Esai Morales; Chelsea Zhang; Joshua Orpin; Savannah Welch; Vincent Kartheiser; Damaris Lewis; Jay Lycurgo; Franka Potente; Joseph Morgan
- Composers: Clint Mansell; Kevin Kiner
- Country of origin: United States
- Original language: English
- No. of seasons: 4
- No. of episodes: 49

Production
- Executive producers: Akiva Goldsman; Geoff Johns; Greg Berlanti; Sarah Schechter; Greg Walker; John Fawcett; Richard Hatem
- Producers: Robert Ortiz; Carol Banker; Jennifer Lence; Carl Ogawa; Michael Wray; Tom Flores
- Production locations: Toronto, Ontario
- Cinematography: Boris Mojsovski; Brendan Steacy; Fraser Brown; Jon Joffin; David Greene
- Editors: Tirsa Hackshaw; Brian Wessel; Sara Mineo; Andrew Kasch; Carol Stutz; Brandon Hwang; JD Dawson; Christina Sophia Castro
- Camera setup: Single-camera
- Running time: 40–55 minutes
- Production companies: Berlanti Productions; Weed Road Pictures (seasons 1–2); DC Entertainment; Warner Bros. Television

Original release
- Network: DC Universe
- Release: October 12, 2018 – November 29, 2019
- Network: HBO Max
- Release: August 12, 2021 – May 11, 2023

Related
- Doom Patrol

Titans is an American superhero television series created by Akiva Goldsman, Geoff Johns, and Greg Berlanti. Based on the DC Comics superhero team Teen Titans, the series depicts a group of young heroes who join forces in their fight against evil. Starring as members of the eponymous Titans, the cast includes Dick Grayson (Brenton Thwaites), Kory Anders (Anna Diop), Rachel Roth (Teagan Croft), Gar Logan (Ryan Potter), Jason Todd (Curran Walters), Donna Troy (Conor Leslie), Hank Hall (Alan Ritchson), Dawn Granger (Minka Kelly), Rose Wilson (Chelsea Zhang), Conner Kent (Joshua Orpin), and Tim Drake (Jay Lycurgo).

A live-action series based on the Teen Titans entered development in September 2014. Intended for TNT, a pilot written by Goldsman and Marc Haimes was ordered that December, but TNT departed from the project in 2016 before filming took place. By April 2017, the series was redeveloped by Goldsman, Johns, and Berlanti for DC Universe as its first original scripted program. Thwaites was cast as Dick in September and other series regulars were cast between August and October.

Titans premiered on October 12, 2018, and ran for four seasons until May 11, 2023. The first and second seasons were released on DC Universe, and the third and fourth seasons were released on HBO Max.

== Premise ==
Titans follows the young superheroes of the eponymous team as they combat evil and other perils. Disbanded when the story begins, the series sees the team return when the original and new members reform the Titans. The Titans fight crime throughout various locations, including Detroit, San Francisco, Gotham City, and Metropolis.

The Titans as they appear in the first season (L–R): Gar (Ryan Potter), Rachel (Teagan Croft), Dick (Brenton Thwaites), and Kory (Anna Diop)

The first members of the team to appear in the series are Batman's former vigilante partner Dick Grayson, extraterrestrial Kory Anders, empath Rachel Roth, and shapeshifter Garfield "Gar" Logan. Dick is later revealed as one of the original Titans, alongside half-Amazon Donna Troy and crime-fighting duo Dawn Granger and Hank Hall. After the Titans reform, the team is joined by Batman's new partner Jason Todd, assassin Rose Wilson, Superman's genetic clone Conner Kent, and aspiring vigilante Tim Drake.

In the first season, Rachel comes to Dick for protection from dangerous forces pursuing her, which leads to them meeting and teaming up with Kory and Gar. The heroes eventually learn that Rachel is being targeted by her demon father Trigon, who seeks to enslave the world. The season also depicts Dick's efforts to distance himself from his mentor and his Robin persona, while Kory struggles with a bout of amnesia that leaves her unaware of her true identity.

The second season focuses on the official reformation of the Titans as Dick trains a new team composed of Rachel, Gar, and Jason. The Titans' return, however, leads to the reemergence of feared assassin Deathstroke, whose prior conflict with the original team caused their disbanding. As Deathstroke attempts to eliminate the heroes, the original Titans are forced to face him again, while other threats emerge from the malevolent Cadmus Laboratories and Kory's sister Blackfire.

The third season sees the Titans travel to Gotham City after Jason is murdered, where Dick teams up in protecting the city with Police Commissioner Barbara Gordon. When Jason returns under the control of notorious criminal Jonathan Crane, the Titans find themselves battling their former teammate to prevent Crane from destroying Gotham. Also depicted are Kory's tense reunion with Blackfire, who seeks redemption for past actions and Donna's return from the afterlife following her death in the previous season.

In the fourth and final season, the Titans' visit to Metropolis is interrupted by the murder of Lex Luthor. They discover an apocalyptic prophecy centered on Sebastian Sanger, Trigon's son, as the Church of Blood, led by Mother Mayhem, plot to have Sebastian fulfill his destiny of destroying the world.

== Cast and characters ==
- Brenton Thwaites as Dick Grayson / Robin / Nightwing: The leader of the Titans and former vigilante sidekick of Batman, seeking to move past his mentor and his Robin persona. A member of the original team, he re-forms the Titans while assuming the new identity of Nightwing. Viewing his character as a "reluctant leader", Thwaites said Dick is "trying to figure out who he is at the same time he's trying to keep the crew protected and safe". Tomaso Sanelli, Viktor Sawchuk, and Taj Levey play the young Dick.
- Anna Diop as Koriand'r / Kory Anders / Starfire: An extraterrestrial royal from the planet Tamaran who has the ability to absorb and redirect solar energy. Sent to Earth to assassinate Rachel, a bout of amnesia causes Kory to forget her mission and join the Titans. Diop commented the character has a "really innocent, naïve, pure, fun, curious thing about her", which she sought to bring to her portrayal, and enjoyed playing an alien due to being a Senegalese immigrant.
- Teagan Croft as Rachel Roth / Raven: An empath born to a demon father and human mother. At first understanding little of her lineage and abilities, Rachel's powers lead her to Dick and subsequently becoming a member of the new Titans. Croft noted Rachel's relationship with Dick is "more of a father-daughter relationship" since they both "share the same feeling of abandonment".
- Ryan Potter as Gar Logan / Beast Boy / Changeling: A shapeshifter who can transform into a green version of various animals, mainly a tiger, after receiving a drug that cured him of a lethal disease. Gar previously lived with the Doom Patrol before joining Dick's new Titans team. A fan of the character since he watched the animated Teen Titans series, Potter described Gar as bringing "a warmth to the show" through "humor and lighthearted moments".
- Curran Walters as Jason Todd / Robin / Red Hood (seasons 2–4; recurring season 1): Dick's successor as Batman's vigilante sidekick who is brought into the new Titans team at the request of Bruce Wayne. According to Walters, Jason has both a "fun" and a "dark side" and transitioning between the two was the most challenging aspect of portraying the character.
- Conor Leslie as Donna Troy / Wonder Girl (seasons 2–3; guest season 1): A half-Amazon sharing their enhanced physical abilities. Formerly Wonder Woman's sidekick, she befriended Dick at an early age and was on the original Titans team. Leslie noted Donna has "a brother-sister friendship" with Dick and the two "understand each other in a way no one else ever will". Andi Hubick and Afrodite Drossos portray the young Donna.
- Minka Kelly as Dawn Granger / Dove (seasons 2–3; recurring season 1): A vigilante who serves as a tactical counterpart to her partner and boyfriend Hank. Kelly described Dawn's fighting style as "more that of a dance" due to the character's background in ballet, jiu-jitsu, and gymnastics, whereas Hank "is a brute and just blows stuff up".
- Alan Ritchson as Hank Hall / Hawk (seasons 2–3; recurring season 1): The aggressive half in a vigilante duo composed of himself and his girlfriend Dawn. In addition to forming the Hawk and Dove team with his half-brother Don, he was part of the original Titans. Initially reluctant to take the role because he previously portrayed Aquaman on the series Smallville, Ritchson said he accepted the part after hearing a pitch from series co-creator Geoff Johns. Tait Blum portrays the young Hank.
- Esai Morales as Slade Wilson / Deathstroke (season 2): A biologically enhanced assassin and former Delta Force operator who has a history with the original Titans. Morales stated Deathstroke's conflict against the Titans is "personal" for him "because you don't mess with a man's family".
- Chelsea Zhang as Rose Wilson (season 2): Deathstroke's daughter, who shares his enhanced reflexes and regenerative healing. For her performance, Zhang said she would reference Rose's comic depiction where "her attitude, her sass, and her sarcasm is written all over the books".
- Joshua Orpin as Subject 13 / Conner Kent / Superboy (seasons 2–4): A genetic clone of Superman and Lex Luthor, possessing the abilities and personality traits of both. Created at Cadmus Laboratories, he comes into contact with the Titans after escaping from the facility with Krypto. Acknowledging he was fascinated by Conner's internal conflict, Orpin noted "he has an extraordinary capacity for good, and for evil" where "nothing is black and white to him, and yet everything is". Body double Brooker Muir plays the character in the first season.
- Savannah Welch as Barbara Gordon (season 3): The commissioner of the Gotham City Police Department, succeeding her late father. Welch, who is an above-knee amputee, found it important to "represent the reality of a woman who is chair-bound as closely as possible" in her performance to ensure "anyone who is chair-bound, or in a position that is close to that, does truly feel represented".
- Vincent Kartheiser as Dr. Jonathan Crane (season 3): A criminal psychologist who exploits the fears of his victims. Incarcerated at Arkham Asylum, he assists the Gotham City police with their investigations. Showrunner Greg Walker described Crane as "a perfect villain" whose knowledge of phobias results in him "working off your feelings and your emotions, and that's where we want to live".
- Damaris Lewis as Komand'r / Blackfire (season 3; guest season 2): A Tamaranean royal and Kory's younger sister. Lacking their family's ability to generate fire, she holds a strained relationship with Kory. Lewis, noting that Blackfire's nature is the result of not being accepted by her family and society, said she was drawn to playing a villainous character because "the villains are the ones who don't fit in".
- Jay Lycurgo as Tim Drake / Robin (season 4; recurring season 3): A resident of Gotham who is a big Batman and Robin fan and wishes to be a hero like them. He joins the Titans at the end of the third season.
- Franka Potente as May Bennett / Mother Mayhem (season 4): A witch and the leader of a blood cult who masquerades as an archaeologist.
- Joseph Morgan as Sebastian Sanger / Brother Blood (season 4): A taxidermist and app designer who has a strange connection to the Temple of Azarath.

== Episodes ==
| Season | Episodes | | Originally released | | |
| Season | Episodes | | First released | Last released | Network |
|---|---|---|---|---|---|
| 1 | 11 | | October 12, 2018 | December 21, 2018 | DC Universe |
| 2 | 13 | | September 6, 2019 | November 29, 2019 | DC Universe |
| 3 | 13 | | August 12, 2021 | October 21, 2021 | HBO Max |
| 4 | 12 | 6 | November 3, 2022 | December 1, 2022 | HBO Max |
| 4 | 12 | 6 | April 13, 2023 | May 11, 2023 | HBO Max |

=== Season 1 (2018) ===
| No. overall | No. in season | Title | Directed by | Written by | Original release date | Prod. code |
|---|---|---|---|---|---|---|
| 1 | 1 | "Titans" | Brad Anderson | Story by : Akiva Goldsman & Geoff Johns & Greg Berlanti; Teleplay by : Akiva Goldsman & Geoff Johns | October 12, 2018 | T15.10146 |
| 2 | 2 | "Hawk and Dove" | Brad Anderson | Akiva Goldsman | October 19, 2018 | T13.20902 |
| 3 | 3 | "Origins" | Kevin Rodney Sullivan | Richard Hatem & Geoff Johns and Marisha Mukerjee & Greg Walker | October 26, 2018 | T13.20904 |
| 4 | 4 | "Doom Patrol" | John Fawcett | Geoff Johns | November 2, 2018 | T13.20905 |
| 5 | 5 | "Together" | Meera Menon | Bryan Edward Hill & Gabrielle Stanton | November 9, 2018 | T13.20906 |
| 6 | 6 | "Jason Todd" | Carol Banker | Richard Hatem & Jeffrey David Thomas | November 16, 2018 | T13.20907 |
| 7 | 7 | "Asylum" | Alex Kalymnios | Bryan Edward Hill & Greg Walker | November 23, 2018 | T13.20908 |
| 8 | 8 | "Donna Troy" | David Frazee | Richard Hatem & Marisha Mukerjee | November 30, 2018 | T13.20909 |
| 9 | 9 | "Hank and Dawn" | Akiva Goldsman | Geoff Johns | December 7, 2018 | T13.20910 |
| 10 | 10 | "Koriand'r" | Maja Vrvilo | Gabrielle Stanton | December 14, 2018 | T13.20911 |
| 11 | 11 | "Dick Grayson" | Glen Winter | Richard Hatem | December 21, 2018 | T13.20912 |

=== Season 2 (2019) ===
| No. overall | No. in season | Title | Directed by | Written by | Original release date | Prod. code |
|---|---|---|---|---|---|---|
| 12 | 1 | "Trigon" | Carol Banker | Akiva Goldsman & Geoff Johns & Greg Walker | September 6, 2019 | T13.21651 |
| 13 | 2 | "Rose" | Nathan Hope | Richard Hatem | September 13, 2019 | T13.21652 |
| 14 | 3 | "Ghosts" | Kevin Tancharoen | Tom Pabst | September 20, 2019 | T13.21653 |
| 15 | 4 | "Aqualad" | Glen Winter | Jamie Gorenberg | September 27, 2019 | T13.21654 |
| 16 | 5 | "Deathstroke" | Nick Gomez | Bianca Sams | October 4, 2019 | T13.21655 |
| 17 | 6 | "Conner" | Alex Kalymnios | Richard Hatem | October 11, 2019 | T13.21656 |
| 18 | 7 | "Bruce Wayne" | Akiva Goldsman | Bryan Edward Hill | October 18, 2019 | T13.21657 |
| 19 | 8 | "Jericho" | Toa Fraser | Kate McCarthy | October 25, 2019 | T13.21658 |
| 20 | 9 | "Atonement" | Boris Mojsovski | Jeffrey David Thomas | November 1, 2019 | T13.21659 |
| 21 | 10 | "Fallen" | Kevin Sullivan | Jamie Gorenberg | November 8, 2019 | T13.21660 |
| 22 | 11 | "E.L._.O." | Millicent Shelton | Bianca Sams | November 15, 2019 | T13.21661 |
| 23 | 12 | "Faux Hawk" | Larnell Stovall | Tom Pabst | November 22, 2019 | T13.21662 |
| 24 | 13 | "Nightwing" | Carol Banker | Richard Hatem & Greg Walker | November 29, 2019 | T13.21663 |

=== Season 3 (2021) ===
| No. overall | No. in season | Title | Directed by | Written by | Original release date | Prod. code |
|---|---|---|---|---|---|---|
| 25 | 1 | "Barbara Gordon" | Carol Banker | Richard Hatem & Geoff Johns | August 12, 2021 | T13.22451 |
| 26 | 2 | "Red Hood" | Carol Banker | Tom Pabst | August 12, 2021 | T13.22452 |
| 27 | 3 | "Hank & Dove" | Millicent Shelton | Jamie Gorenberg | August 12, 2021 | T13.22453 |
| 28 | 4 | "Blackfire" | Millicent Shelton | Stephanie Coggins | August 19, 2021 | T13.22454 |
| 29 | 5 | "Lazarus" | Boris Mojsovski | Bryan Edward Hill | August 26, 2021 | T13.22455 |
| 30 | 6 | "Lady Vic" | Nick Gomez | Joshua Levy & Prathi Srinivasan | September 2, 2021 | T13.22456 |
| 31 | 7 | "51%" | Nick Gomez | Kate McCarthy | September 9, 2021 | T13.22457 |
| 32 | 8 | "Home" | Larnell Stovall | Tom Pabst | September 16, 2021 | T13.22458 |
| 33 | 9 | "Souls" | Boris Mojsovski | Richard Hatem | September 23, 2021 | T13.22459 |
| 34 | 10 | "Troubled Water" | Larnell Stovall | Melissa Brides | September 30, 2021 | T13.22460 |
| 35 | 11 | "The Call Is Coming from Inside the House" | Carol Banker | Stephanie Coggins | October 7, 2021 | T13.22461 |
| 36 | 12 | "Prodigal" | Carol Banker | Jamie Gorenberg & Bryan Edward Hill | October 14, 2021 | T13.22462 |
| 37 | 13 | "Purple Rain" | Chad Lowe | Richard Hatem & Greg Walker | October 21, 2021 | T13.22463 |

=== Season 4 (2022–23) ===
| No. overall | No. in season | Title | Directed by | Written by | Original release date | Prod. code |
|---|---|---|---|---|---|---|
Part 1
| 38 | 1 | "Lex Luthor" | Nick Copus | Richard Hatem | November 3, 2022 | T13.23551 |
| 39 | 2 | "Mother Mayhem" | Nick Copus | Bryan Edward Hill | November 3, 2022 | T13.23552 |
| 40 | 3 | "Jinx" | Boris Mojsovski | Jamie Gorenberg | November 10, 2022 | T13.23553 |
| 41 | 4 | "Super Super Mart" | Boris Mojsovski | Tom Pabst | November 17, 2022 | T13.23554 |
| 42 | 5 | "Inside Man" | Jen McGowan | Joshua Levy & Prathi Srinivasan | November 24, 2022 | T13.23555 |
| 43 | 6 | "Brother Blood" | Jen McGowan | Richard Hatem | December 1, 2022 | T13.23556 |
Part 2
| 44 | 7 | "Caul's Folly" | Greg Walker | Melissa Brides | April 13, 2023 | T13.23558 |
| 45 | 8 | "Dick & Carol & Ted & Kory" | Greg Walker | Tom Pabst | April 13, 2023 | T13.23559 |
| 46 | 9 | "Dude, Where's My Gar?" | Eric Dean Seaton | Teleplay by : Geoff Johns; Story by : Geoff Johns & Ryan Potter | April 20, 2023 | T13.23557 |
| 47 | 10 | "Game Over" | Jesse Warn | Bryan Edward Hill | April 27, 2023 | T13.23560 |
| 48 | 11 | "Project Starfire" | Nick Copus | Jamie Gorenberg | May 4, 2023 | T13.23561 |
| 49 | 12 | "Titans Forever" | Nick Copus | Richard Hatem | May 11, 2023 | T13.23562 |

== Production ==
=== Development ===
A potential live-action Titans project for cable channel TNT was announced in September 2014. By December, a pilot written by Akiva Goldsman and Marc Haimes was ordered that would feature Dick Grayson emerging from Batman's shadow to become Nightwing, the leader of a band of heroes including Starfire, Raven, Hawk and Dove, and Oracle. The pilot was set with filming to occur in Toronto in mid-2015. In May 2015, TNT president Kevin Reilly said that they hoped to have the casting locked down by the start of filming and that the show would be "very true" to the comics and "groundbreaking". The series, called Titans and then Blackbirds, was first set to begin shooting in Toronto in mid-2015. Production was then postponed to October. In January 2016, TNT was no longer moving forward with the project. Geoff Johns later commented that he and DC knew about TNT nixing Titans for months. Johns, who had spent seven years developing the material with Goldsman, said in October 2018 that the project depended on securing the rights to Dick Grayson. He said: "You couldn't do Titans without Robin ... So there was a lot of behind-the-scenes work that went into that". Previous Titans projects had been hampered by the rights to Batman being locked up.

In April 2017, Warner Bros. announced the series Titans to debut in 2018 on DC Comics' own direct-to-consumer digital service. The series was developed by Goldsman, Johns, Greg Berlanti and Sarah Schechter, with Goldsman, Johns and Berlanti writing the pilot episode. Showrunner duties were given to Greg Walker. All are also executive producers of the series for Weed Road Pictures and Berlanti Productions in association with Warner Bros Television. Though twelve episodes were initially announced, the eleventh episode was billed as the first-season finale in December 2018.

Ahead of the series' premiere at New York Comic Con in October 2018, Titans was renewed for a second season and the elements of the twelfth episode of the first season were moved to the second season's premiere. The 13-episode second season premiered on September 6, 2019. Production of season 2 was temporarily put on hold in July 2019 due to the accidental death of special effects coordinator Warren Appleby; the season 2 premiere is dedicated in his memory.

The third season was scheduled to premiere in the fourth quarter of 2020, but was delayed amid the COVID-19 pandemic. For the third season, the series moved to HBO Max. The third season takes place in Gotham City and features the appearances of Barbara Gordon, Red Hood, and Jonathan Crane.

The fourth and final season premiered on November 3, 2022, and ended on May 11, 2023.

=== Writing ===
Johns noted the series was inspired mostly by the Teen Titans comics of the 1980s, since that comic's run "had so much drama" and "was so revolutionary for its time". He added: "We really wanted to lean into the idea that every Titan of these Titans is a doorway into another genre. With Rachel [a.k.a. Raven], it's the supernatural and the horror, and the first season really focuses on who Raven is and how the Titans galvanize around her". Johns also felt the series would be "a little more adult" than the television series Riverdale, calling it "not necessarily a teen drama, but more of an adventure piece". Regarding the show's tone, Johns said that they "wanted to do something different from everything else out there. We wanted to arrive at a tone that wasn't as welcoming as some of the DC shows have been, nor as nihilistic as some of the films have been". Goldsman said that as the series continues, it will ask "How are these broken people going to cohere? Or will they?" Johns noted that Robin's infamous line in the pilot—"Fuck Batman"—was a late addition to the script. Thwaites said of the line: "I thought it was perfect ... This is not a show about Batman. It's a show about Dick".

=== Casting ===
In early August 2017, Teagan Croft was cast as Rachel Roth, followed at the end of the month with the casting of Anna Diop as Kory Anders, and Brenton Thwaites as Dick Grayson. Ahead of the series premiere, Diop reduced her presence on social media because of racist attacks towards her casting. The main cast for the first season would be rounded out by Ryan Potter as Gar Logan, who was announced in October. In early September, Alan Ritchson and Minka Kelly were cast in the recurring roles of Hank Hall and Dawn Granger, respectively. By the end of the month, Lindsey Gort was cast as Amy Rohrbach. In January 2018, Seamus Dever was cast in an undisclosed role that would later be revealed as Trigon, and a month later, members of the Doom Patrol were announced with Bruno Bichir as the Chief, April Bowlby as Rita Farr, Jake Michaels as Cliff Steele, and Dwain Murphy as Larry Trainor. Curran Walters and Conor Leslie appear as Jason Todd and Donna Troy, respectively. In August, Elliot Knight was cast as Don Hall.

In February 2019, Joshua Orpin was cast as Conner for season two. After the character was teased by Johns, Esai Morales was cast as Deathstroke in March, with Chella Man and Chelsea Zhang cast as his children Jericho and Rose. Iain Glen was cast as Bruce Wayne in April. Actors and stuntmen Alain Moussi and Maxime Savaria portrayed Batman in the first-season finale. In June, Natalie Gumede and Drew Van Acker were cast as Mercy Graves and Garth, respectively. In July, Genevieve Angelson was cast as Cadmus Laboratories scientist Dr. Eve Watson. In August, Michael Mosley was cast as Dr. Light. The same month, Oluniké Adeliyi joined the cast in an undisclosed role that was later revealed as burlesque dancer Mati Matisse, and Hanneke Talbot was revealed to be Shimmer. In September, Demore Barnes was cast as Wintergreen. Damaris Lewis was later cast to portray Kory's sister Blackfire.

During filming of the third season in January 2021, Savannah Welch was cast to portray Barbara Gordon. Jay Lycurgo was also revealed to be playing Tim Drake. That April, Vincent Kartheiser joined the cast as Dr. Jonathan Crane.

In January 2022, Joseph Morgan, Franka Potente, and Lisa Ambalavanar were cast as season 4 characters Brother Blood, Mother Mayhem, and Jinx, respectively. Titus Welliver was cast to play Lex Luthor in September. The same month, Brec Bassinger was cast to reprise her role as Courtney Whitmore / Stargirl from the series Stargirl.

=== Filming ===
Filming for the first season began on November 15, 2017, in Toronto, and Hamilton, Ontario, and concluded on June 28, 2018. Filming for the second season began on April 2, 2019, and concluded on October 8 the same year. Production was put on hold due to the July accidental death of special effects coordinator Warren Appleby before resuming. After being delayed by the COVID-19 pandemic, filming for the third season began on October 13, 2020, and concluded on June 15, 2021. Filming for the fourth season began on February 28, 2022, and concluded on September 30.

== Release ==
=== Broadcast ===
The first episode was screened at New York Comic Con on October 3, 2018, with Titans debuting on October 12 on the DC Universe subscription streaming service. The first season comprised eleven episodes, and each episode was released weekly on DC Universe until the season finale aired on December 21. Outside the United States, the first season became available for streaming via Netflix on January 11, 2019. The first season was rebroadcast by TNT, beginning on July 12, 2021.

The second season premiered on September 6, 2019, and concluded on November 29, comprising 13 episodes. Outside the United States, the second season became available for streaming via Netflix on January 10, 2020.

The third season premiered on HBO Max on August 12, 2021. Outside the United States, season 3 arrived on Netflix on December 8 the same year.

The fourth season premiered on November 3, 2022. It included 12 episodes. The series finale aired on May 11, 2023. Netflix released season four in the rest of the world in June, although for the first week, the episodes 7 and 9 were swapped around.

=== Home media ===
The first season of Titans was released digitally on March 21, 2019, and on DVD and Blu-Ray on July 16. The second season was released digitally and on DVD and Blu-Ray on March 3, 2020. The third season was released on DVD and Blu-Ray on October 25, 2022. The fourth season and complete series were both released on DVD on October 17, 2023, in addition to a manufacture on demand Blu-ray of the fourth season from Warner Archive Collection.

== Reception ==
=== Critical response ===
Critical response of Titans
| Season | Rotten Tomatoes | Metacritic |
|---|---|---|
| 1 | 78% (46 reviews) | 55 (12 reviews) |
| 2 | 81% (21 reviews) | —N/a |
| 3 | 100% (22 reviews) | —N/a |
| 4 | 100% (6 reviews) | —N/a |

On Rotten Tomatoes, the first season of Titans holds an approval rating of 78%, with an average rating of 6.7 out of 10 based on 46 reviews. The site's critical consensus states: "Despite a few tonal growing pains, Titans does justice to its source material and truly shines when its titular ensemble finally assembles". Metacritic gave the series' first season a score of 55 out of 100 based on 12 critics, indicating "mixed or average reviews".

Susana Polo of Polygon praised Titans for "tempering brutal violence and dark subject matter with humor—and by giving its characters plenty of time to stretch, breathe and become attached to one another". Charlie Ridgely of ComicBook.com wrote that Diop "conveys so much wonder and intrigue with her subtle and genuine expressions, but there is a consistent fierceness and tenacity that is always lurking just beneath the surface". Rosie Knight of Nerdist wrote that the "cast is at the core of what makes Titans so enjoyable", while giving praise to the script as well. Forbes contributor Merrill Barr compared the show to The CW's Riverdale, describing it as "a dark and gritty series very far removed from the image the Teen Titans have garnered through a variety of animated outings over the last decade". Barr found that viewers "that take the tone in stride are going to find themselves in the middle of a series dialed directly into their interests". Rob Salkowitz of Forbes wrote that Titans "somehow managed to deliver on the dark-and-foreboding tone that the early DC movies so conspicuously got wrong".

Kevin Yeoman of Screen Rant was critical of the show's excessive violence, writing that Titans "doesn't put forward any new or particularly compelling thoughts about its characters or about superheroes in general". Similarly, Vinnie Mancuso of Collider said that "if you're just a fan of some good old-fashioned ultra-violence and moody storytelling, this simply isn't a well-done example of that".

The second season holds an 81% approval rating on Rotten Tomatoes, based on 21 reviews. Its critical consensus reads: "Though Titans's sophomore season suffers from a slight slump at the start, it quickly resets itself, building on the momentum from its first season while laying fascinating framework for where the show could go".

The third season has a 100% approval rating on Rotten Tomatoes, with an average rating of 8.2 out of 10, based on 22 reviews. Its critical consensus reads: "With bolder storytelling and deeper characterization, Titans' third season hits the show's sweet spot to deliver the best season yet".

The fourth season has a 100% approval rating on Rotten Tomatoes, with an average rating of 6.6 out of 10, based on 6 reviews.

=== Awards and nominations ===
| Year | Award | Category | Nominee(s) | Result | Ref. |
|---|---|---|---|---|---|
| 2019 | Canadian Society of Cinematographers Awards | TV Drama Cinematography | Boris Mojsovski for ("Pilot") | Won | |
| 2019 | Canadian Society of Cinematographers Awards | TV series Cinematography | Brendan Steacy for ("Dick Grayson") | Nominated | |
| 2019 | Golden Trailer Awards | Best Action TV Spot/Trailer/Teaser for a Series | Titans "So Dark (Deadpool)", Warner Bros., WB Worldwide Television Marketing In House | Won | |
| 2019 | Teen Choice Awards | Choice Action TV Actor | Brenton Thwaites | Won | |
| 2019 | American Society of Cinematographers Awards | Episode of a Series for Non-Commercial Television | Brendan Steacy for ("Dick Grayson") | Nominated | |

== Further media ==
=== Spin-off ===
In May 2018, DC Universe announced the live-action series Doom Patrol as an intended spin-off to Titans. Despite the initial order and sharing characters and actors, however, Doom Patrol occupies a separate continuity. Developed by Jeremy Carver (who wrote the pilot) for Warner Bros. Television and Berlanti Productions, the series features the Chief, Cliff Steele, Larry Trainor, Cyborg, Rita Farr, and Jane as the members of eponymous Doom Patrol. April Bowlby, Matt Bomer, and Brendan Fraser reprise their roles as Rita, the voice of Larry, and the voice of Cliff, while Matthew Zuk and Riley Shanahan replace Dwain Murphy and Jake Michaels for the physical portrayals of Larry and Cliff and Timothy Dalton replaces Bruno Bichir as the Chief. The cast was joined by Diane Guerrero as Jane and Joivan Wade as Cyborg. Production began in August the same year and the series premiered on February 15, 2019.

=== Arrowverse ===
The Titans incarnations of Hank Hall, Jason Todd, Rachel Roth, Kory Anders, and Dawn Granger make cameo appearances in the Arrowverse crossover event "Crisis on Infinite Earths", with Alan Ritchson, Curran Walters, Teagan Croft, Anna Diop, and Minka Kelly appearing in their respective roles through archival footage. The event depicts Titans as being set on the world of Earth-9.
