= Ravager (DC Comics) =

Fictional characters in the DC universe

- Grant Wilson, the original Ravager, on the cover to The New Teen Titans #2. Art by George Pérez

Publication information
- Publisher: DC Comics
- First appearance: (Grant); New Teen Titans #1 (November 1980) (unknown); Batman #440 (October 1989) (Walsh); Tales of the Teen Titans #44 (July 1984) (as Ravager); Deathstroke the Terminator #1 (August 1991) (LaFarge); Deathstroke, the Hunted #0 (October 1994)
- Created by: (Grant); George Pérez, Marv Wolfman, Romeo Tanghal (Walsh); Marv Wolfman, George Pérez (LaFarge); Marv Wolfman, Sergio Cariello

In-story information
- Alter ego: Grant Wilson; Bill Walsh; Wade DeFarge; Rose Wilson
- Team affiliations: (Grant and Walsh); H.I.V.E. Black Lantern Corps
- Supporting character of: (unknown); Two-Face
- Notable aliases: (Walsh); The Jackal
- Abilities: (Grant); Enhanced strength and reflexes
The Ravagers
Publication information
- Schedule: Monthly
- Format: Ongoing series
- Genre: Superhero
- Publication date: July 2012 – July 2013
- No. of issues: 13 (including issue #0)
Creative team
- Written by: Howard Mackie (#1-7, 0), Michael Alan Nelson (#8-12), Tony Bedard (#10-12)
- Artist(s): Eduardo Pansica and Daniel HDR (#7), Geraldo Borges (#7, 11)
- Penciller(s): Ian Churchill (#1-3, 5-7, 0), Daniel Sampere and Stefano Martino (#4), Julius Gopez (#5), Tyler Kirkham (#6), Ig Guara (#8-10), Diogene Neves (#10-12)
- Inker: Norm Rapmund (#1-6, 0, 8-10) Vicente Cifuentes (#10-12)
Collected editions
- Vol. 1 The Kids From N.O.W.H.E.R.E: ISBN 1-4012-4091-7

Ravager is an alias used by multiple fictional characters appearing in comic books published by DC Comics. Most appear in series featuring the Teen Titans and have a connection to the villain Slade Wilson / Deathstroke. The name has also been used by the unrelated super-hero team The Ravagers.

The first Ravager was Grant Wilson, the eldest son of Deathstroke. The Ravager alias was subsequently used by an unnamed assassin working for Harvey Dent / Two-Face, Deathstroke's rival Bill Walsh, and Deathstroke's half-brother Wade LaFarge. The most recent and current Ravager is Rose Wilson, Deathstroke's daughter, who is the only heroic character to adopt the alias.

In live action, Ravager debuted amalgamated into the character Isabel Rochev in the second season of the Arrowverse series Arrow, portrayed by Summer Glau. Grant Wilson appeared in the first season of Legends of Tomorrow and final season of Arrow, portrayed by Jamie Andrew Cutler. Chelsea Zhang portrayed Rose Wilson in her live-action debut in the second season of the series Titans.

== Fictional character biography ==
=== Grant Wilson ===
Grant Wilson as Ravager, in Booster Gold #22 (July 2009). Art by Michael Norton (pencils) and Dan Jurgens, Guy Major, Hi-Fi Design, Norm Rapmund (inks and colors).

The first Ravager is Deathstroke's older son Grant Wilson. While living in New York City, Grant's apartment is wrecked by the sudden arrival of the alien princess Starfire and the Gordanians following her. Grant blames the Teen Titans for the events and takes a contract from H.I.V.E. to kill them. H.I.V.E. gives Grant a serum that allows him to imitate his father's abilities and enhanced reflexes. However, the procedure is flawed and soon kills Grant, causing Deathstroke to hold the Titans responsible for his death.

Grant is temporarily resurrected by Brother Blood to guard Kid Eternity. In the Teen Titans tie-in to the Blackest Night crossover, Grant Wilson is reanimated as a member of the Black Lantern Corps and attacks his father Deathstroke and his half-sister Rose Wilson.

==== The New 52 ====
In September 2011, The New 52 rebooted DC's continuity. In this new timeline, Grant's history was changed. He appears to have been beaten and killed in an explosion by Midnighter, but returns after a few years trying to kill his father. Grant surreptitiously manipulates Deathstroke, by allying himself with the fathers of one of Slade's victims and sending a number of villains called Legacy to weaken the mercenary before facing him. Despite having a chance to kill Deathstroke, Grant hesitates and walks away. Grant is later killed by Deathstroke in his attempt to kill Jericho (Joseph Wilson), Deathstroke's son.

==== DC Rebirth ====
Grant's backstory is expanded upon in Deathstroke: Rebirth. In his younger years as a child, he had a strained relationship with his father Slade, who was hard on him, and was distant from his younger brother Joseph. His strained family life provokes him to run away as a teenager, unknowingly encountering young members of H.I.V.E who have been spying on his family and take the chance to recruit him. Grant established a relationship with one of the young women and came to join H.I.V.E in his adult life. In the storyline "The Lazarus Contract", Deathstroke attempts to resurrect Grant by stealing Wally West and Ace West's super-speed to travel back in time and change the past, but is unsuccessful.

=== Unknown ===
The second Ravager is an unnamed assassin who is hired by Two-Face to eliminate Batman. Ravager lures Batman into a trap by building up his reputation as a dangerous serial killer. During a confrontation on the side of a dam, Batman kicks Ravager into the rushing water below, never to be seen again.

=== Bill Walsh ===
Bill Walsh battling Deathstroke, in Deathstroke, the Terminator #4. Art by Mike Zeck

The third Ravager is Bill Walsh, a former rival of Deathstroke's who takes up the title to lure Deathstroke into battle. Years before assuming the name Ravager, Walsh was known as the Jackal and was hired by Wade LaFarge to kidnap Slade's younger son Joseph, which resulted in Joseph's throat being slit and him being rendered mute. As Ravager, Walsh attempts to kill Slade with a bomb. Slade instead kills Walsh and defuses the bomb.

=== Wade LaFarge ===
The fourth Ravager is Wade LaFarge, a small-time hitman and Slade Wilson's half-brother who uses the Ravager name in mockery of him. A former lover of Slade's wife Adeline Kane, LaFarge becomes obsessed with destroying Slade and Adeline's relationship. Years later, Ravager is offered $100,000 by an anonymous source to perform a hit on Rose Wilson, Slade's daughter. He murders Rose's foster parents, but is killed by Rose, who has become Slade's apprentice.

In the Teen Titans tie-in to the Blackest Night crossover, Wade LaFarge is resurrected as a Black Lantern and attacks Rose and Slade.

=== Rose Wilson ===
The fifth Ravager is Rose Wilson, Slade's illegitimate daughter. At one period, Deathstroke manipulates and brainwashes her into becoming his apprentice. After a brief stint training with Nightwing in an attempt to make the Secret Society of Super Villains leave Blüdhaven alone, Rose realizes that Deathstroke does not have her best interests at heart and leaves him. One year after the events of Infinite Crisis, Rose joins the Teen Titans.

== The Ravagers ==
The Ravagers (rather than Ravager) also exist as the name of a team in DC Comics. In September 2011, The New 52 rebooted DC's continuity. In this new timeline, the Ravagers are introduced as a group of super-powered teens who escaped the plans of Harvest in the Culling. The Ravagers title first appeared as part of The New 52's Second Wave in 2012. The team was formed after the Teen Titans and the Legionnaires stuck in the present day were abducted by Harvest, and then later stopped the villain and escaped. The team includes Beast Boy, Terra, Thunder and Lightning, Ridge, and Caitlin Fairchild.

== Other versions ==
=== Titans Tomorrow ===
A possible future version of Rose Wilson appears in the "Titans Tomorrow" storyline. This version is a member of Titans East and is in a relationship with Bart Allen.

=== Flashpoint ===
An alternate universe version of Rose Wilson appears in the Flashpoint tie-in Deathstroke and the Curse of the Ravager.

=== DC Bombshells ===
An alternate universe version of Rose Wilson / Ravager appears in DC Comics Bombshells. This version is a founding member of the Suicide Squad.

== In other media ==
=== Television ===
- Characters based on individuals who have used the Ravager alias appear in media set in the Arrowverse:
  - A character loosely based on Rose Wilson / Ravager named Isabel Rochev appears in the second season of Arrow, portrayed by Summer Glau.
  - A possible future version of Grant Wilson / Deathstroke from the year 2046 appears in the Legends of Tomorrow episode "Star City 2046", portrayed by Jaime Andrew Cutler. By this time period, he has taken up the mantle of Deathstroke from his father Slade Wilson and taken over Star City before he is defeated by his versions of the Green Arrow and John Diggle Jr. as well as the time-traveling Legends.
  - The present day version of Grant Wilson / Deathstroke appears in the Arrow episode "Present Tense", portrayed again by Jaime Andrew Cutler. He forms and leads the Deathstroke Gang in an attempt to destroy Star City, only to be foiled by the Green Arrow and his allies, arrested by the authorities, and incarcerated at Blackgate Penitentiary.
- The Rose Wilson incarnation of Ravager appears in Teen Titans Go! (2013), voiced by Pamela Adlon.
- The Rose Wilson incarnation of Ravager appears in the second season of Titans, portrayed by Chelsea Zhang.

=== Film ===
The Jackal appears in Deathstroke: Knights & Dragons: The Movie, voiced by Chris Jai Alex.

=== Video games ===
- The Rose Wilson incarnation of Ravager appears in DC Universe Online.
- The Rose Wilson incarnation of Ravager appears as a support card in the mobile version of Injustice: Gods Among Us.
- The Teen Titans Go! (2013) incarnation of Rose Wilson / Ravager appears as a non-playable character in Lego Dimensions, voiced again by Pamela Adlon.
- The Rose Wilson incarnation of Ravager appears as a playable character in Lego DC Super-Villains.
- The Rose Wilson incarnation of Ravager appears as a playable character in DC Legends.

=== Miscellaneous ===
- The Rose Wilson incarnation of Ravager appears in Teen Titans Go! (2004) #49.
- The Rose Wilson incarnation of Ravager appears in Smallville Season 11.
- The Rose Wilson incarnation of Ravager makes cameo appearances in DC Super Hero Girls as a student of Super Hero High.
- Isabel Rochev and Wade DeFarge appear in the Arrow tie-in novel Arrow: Vengeance. The latter is stated to be Slade Wilson's commanding officer in the ASIS and half-brother of Billy Wintergreen. After Slade abuses government resources to locate Oliver Queen, DeFarge confronts Slade, who eventually kills him.
- The Jackal appears in Deathstroke: Knights & Dragons, voiced by Chris Jai Alex. This version is an armored mercenary and member of H.I.V.E. partnered with Bronze Tiger.
