= Dick Grayson (Titans character) =

Character on the show "Titans"

Dick Grayson Robin / Nightwing
- Brenton Thwaites as Dick Grayson
- First appearance: "Titans"; Titans; October 12, 2018
- Last appearance: "Titans Forever"; Titans; May 11, 2023
- Based on: Dick Grayson by: Bill Finger; Bob Kane; Jerry Robinson
- Adapted by: Akiva Goldsman; Geoff Johns; Greg Berlanti
- Portrayed by: Brenton Thwaites; Tomaso Sanelli (young; Season 1); Viktor Sawchuk (young; Season 3)

In-universe information
- Full name: Richard John Grayson
- Aliases: Robin; Nightwing
- Nickname: Dick
- Species: Human
- Gender: Male
- Occupation: Vigilante; Leader of the Titans; Detective
- Affiliation: Titans
- Family: John Grayson (father); Mary Grayson (mother); Bruce Wayne (adoptive father); Jason Todd (adoptive brother); Tim Drake (adoptive brother) Damian Wayne (adoptive brother)
- Significant others: Barbara Gordon (ex-girlfriend); Jinx (ex-lover); Dawn Granger/Dove (ex-girlfriend); Koriand’r/Kory Anders/Starfire (girlfriend)
- Home: Wayne Manor, Gotham City

Richard John "Dick" Grayson, also known by his superhero alias Nightwing, is a fictional character and a superhero on the DC Universe, and later HBO Max, television series Titans, based on the character of the same name created by Bill Finger, and adapted for television by Akiva Goldsman, Geoff Johns and Greg Berlanti. In this version, he has been acting as a superhero, going by Robin, for about 16 years, operating in Gotham City, under the wing of his adoptive father, Bruce Wayne / Batman, until he decides to leave the city, assuming the name Nightwing in the second season. Dick Grayson was portrayed by Brenton Thwaites from 2018 until 2023.

== Concept and creation ==
Dick Grayson was created in 1940, and first appeared in Detective Comics #38, as Robin and as Nightwing in Tales of the Teen Titans #44 in 1984. As one of the most prominent superhero characters for DC Comics and members of the Bat Family, Dick was previously portrayed in TV several times, with the first time being in the 1960s Batman television series and then again in 1979 in Legends of the Superheroes and in 2019 Supergirl episode for the Arrowverse crossover event "Crisis on Infinite Earths", where he was played by Burt Ward. In animated form, he appeared on the TV shows Super Friends, Batman: The Animated Series, Teen Titans, The Batman, Batman: The Brave and the Bold, Young Justice, New Teen Titans and Teen Titans Go!, voiced by Casey Kasem, Burt Ward, Loren Lester, Scott Menville, Eve Sabara (Note: Originally credited as Evan Sabara; Eve came out as a trans woman in 2020.)), Crawford Wilson, and Jesse McCartney. The character has also appeared in films, first appearing in Lambert Hillyer's 1943 film serial Batman played by Douglas Croft. Two other versions of the character later appeared in Batman and Robin, Batman Forever and Batman & Robin, played by Johnny Duncan and Chris O'Donnell.

With the announcement of a live-action Titans TV show in 2014, then director Geoff Johns stated that the show was not moving forward because they wanted to secure the appearance of Dick Grayson. In 2017, Warner Bros. announced the show Titans to debut in 2018 on DC Comics' own direct-to-consumer digital service, and Brenton Thwaites was cast as Robin.

=== Characterization ===
The character made his debut in season 1 as the show's primary protagonist. In the show, Dick Grayson goes through an identity crisis, trying to emerge from Batman's shadow to become Nightwing, while also acting as the leader of a band of heroes. In an interview, Thwaites said that it was an honor for him to portray the character, as he is a big fan of Batman and the DC comic books, while adding that in season 1, Dick hates Batman, because he blames him for what he has become, but deeply loves and cares for him, while he has to figure out who he wants to be, taking on a similar role that Bruce took when adopted him, that of protecting a young metahuman named Rachel Roth. When asked in what stage do the audience find Dick, Thwaites said that he is in a transition stage, maturing as a person and becoming his own hero. For the second season, Thwaites said that the team that he works with in the show, helps Dick, by taking on the role of its leader, as he has to inspire them and lead by example. The new villain of the season, Deathstroke hunts Dick and pushes him to grow as a person. Thwaites has stated that the physical aspect of the role was the most challenging.

== Fictional character biography ==
=== Early life ===
Dick was born in 1990 to John and Mary Grayson, a pair of trapeze artists known by their stage name the Flying Graysons. In 2002, when Dick was twelve, Tony Zucco used hydrofluoric acid to burn the Flying Graysons' trapeze ropes, causing them to fall to their death. Dick was adopted by billionaire socialite Bruce Wayne. Boiling with grief and resentment, Dick made several attempts to run away, stealing Bruce's car to search for clues about his parents' deaths. Bruce, sensing Dick's turmoil, revealed himself as Batman, and offered Dick a position as his sidekick, Robin. During his time as superhero, he became romantically involved with Barbara Gordon and the two fought Lady Vic at one point. He befriended fellow heroes, Hank Hall / Hawk and Dawn Granger / Dove. He pursued a romantic relationship with Dawn, but did not continue. He would also meet Donna Troy / Wonder Girl and Garth / Aqualad, and together with Hank and Dawn formed the superhero team, Titans. Their first mission was against Doctor Light, who they defeated. At some point, Slade Wilson / Deathstroke, killed Garth and forced Dick to disassemble the Titans. In 2016, he found Zucco, but before he could kill him, members of the Maroni crime family fatally shot him.

=== Reforming the Titans ===
In 2017, he left Gotham and went to Detroit, after Batman became too violent with his techniques. There he became a detective for the Detroit Police Department. A year after, he first met Rachel Roth, when she got arrested for the alleged murder of her mother. Rachel revealed to him that he is the protagonist of visions she was having, with her escaping after some police officers try to kill her. He manages to track her in a hotel room, and offers her his help to find what her powers are. Rachel agreed, and went to hide in a motel. They two of them go to Washington, D.C., to meet with Dick's former fellow superheroes, Hank and Dawn. Dawn allowed them to stay in their house, with Dick calling Alfred Pennyworth to transfer some money, because he lacked of them at the time. Dick and Hank had numerous fights while he stayed in his house, because of Dick's romantic past with Dawn. At one night, assassins calling themselves the "Nuclear Family" attacked the heroes, but managed to hold them back. After the incident, Rachel went back to the orphanage, Saint Paul's Convent, and Dick investigated a woman named Kory Anders, who was also after Rachel trying to help her. At some point, Rachel escaped the orphanage, with him and Kory pursuing her, finding her in a house, engulfed in darkness. He promised to her that he will never leave her alone again, and Rachel came back to her senses. In the mid time, Gar Logan, who had met Rachel and liked her, joined them. When Dick, Kory, Gar and Rachel were at a motel to take a break, they were attacked by the Family. The two sides fought, with the heroes coming victorious. Later, they interrogated them and Dick found out that a one who sent them was in Chicago. He found and met, in an apartment, a person called Dr. Anderson, only for missioners of the organization the doctor was working for to attack them and kill him. As Dick was searching for a way out of the apartment, Jason Todd / Robin appeared and saved him. Dick and Jason went to a safe house, where the later informed him about Nick Zucco, who's hunting and killing former circus members; the one his family was working was working in. After returning to his team, he learned that Rachel and Gar went to an asylum, that her mother was kept. Dick and Kory followed them, but he was captured and tortured. Through the torturing he realised that Bruce had nothing to do with him being a violent and ruthless person, when in reality he was responsible for it. Dick was soon rescued by Rachel, Gar and Rachel's mother. Kory burnt the asylum, and Dick throw his Robin suit, giving up the mental. The following day, he left the team to go back to Gotham and have a discussion with Bruce, putting Kory in charge. During his way home, he met with Donna Troy, and she helped him find who he is. Donna also helped him translate a Kory's text, which was about killing Rachel. After the two confronted her, she revealed to them that she was from another planet, and was on a mission to kill a demon named Trigon, and only Rachel could do it. Then, Trigon possessed Dick, who went after the team. Rachel entered Dick's mind, and brought him back to his senses. Rachel fought Trigon and sent him back to Hell. After the event, he, Rachel, Gar, Jason and Kory went to Bruce Wayne, where Dick asked for his help, while also telling him he was not to blame for his behavior. Bruce allowed him to use the old Titan's team tower base in San Francisco.

=== Becoming Nightwing ===
For three months, Dick was training the new Titans team. One night, he saw on the news a girl escaping from the San Francisco Police Department. Dick went after her and found her, bringing her to the tower. At that time he received a phone call from Hank, informing him that Doctor Light attacked him and Dawn. Dick invited them to the tower, something they agreed to. After being consoled by Bruce, who told him that the girl has a lot of similarities with him when he first adopted him, Dick told to the girl to stay in the tower, and she agreed. After a while, Dick took the girl, who revealed her name being Rose, for coffee, but they were attacked by Doctor Light, successfully escaping him. When they returned to the tower, Gar informed him that Rose is the daughter of Slade Wilson / Deathstroke. Dick had a meeting with Hank, Dawn and Donna about Rose, but they agreed to focus on taking down Doctor Light first. At one point, Doctor Light kidnapped Jason, revealing he was working with Deathstroke, who killed the Doctor after saying he wants to leave. Deathstroke revealed that he wanted to take back his daughter and also stop the Titans. After some time, Dick found Deathstroke in a church with his son Jericho. Dick fought Slade, but Jericho was accidentally killed. After that, Slade attacked the Titans, but was confronted by Dick, wearing his Nightwing costume. During their fight, Rose killed her father. Afterwards, they went to stop a confused Conner / Superboy, who was attacking a circus. The team managed to stop him, but Donna Troy / Wonder Girl died from electrocution.

During the Anti-Monitor's attack on the Multiverse, Dick's universe, dubbed Earth-9, was destroyed. After a team of heroes, the Paragons with the help of Oliver Queen / Spectre, fought the Anti-Monitor, they restarted the Multiverse, reestablishing Earth-9.

=== Stopping Red Hood ===
After learning that the Joker killed Jason, Dick returns to Gotham City. He discovered Jason had been working with chemistry equipment, which was used to create an unidentified drug. He reunited with Bruce and Police Commissioner of the GCPD, Barbara Gordon. Dick begins to question Bruce's mental state over losing Jason. His suspicions are confirmed when he found out that the Joker was murdered by Bruce, who departed and retired after tasking Dick with protecting Gotham. To help Dick protect Gotham, Kory, Gar, Conner, Hank and Dawn arrive at the team's new base in Wayne Manor. When a new criminal appeared in Gotham, Barbara informed Dick that the incarcerated Jonathan Crane has been serving as a police consultant and through his help, the Titans are able to track down the criminal to an abandoned munitions building. Dick engages in a fight with him, who is revealed to be a still-alive Jason. Jason identifies himself as Red Hood before escaping. After a while, Hank is lured into a trap by Jason, who implanted an explosive device in his chest, demanding a lot of gold bars from Dick, with him refusing. Using the device's schematics, Dick gives Conner the task of creating a deactivator. Dawn found where Jason was, but was tricked into activating the bomb, killing Hank.

In the aftermath of Hank's death, Dawn left the Titans. Crane is removed from Arkham after Jason ordered his assassination, but Dick abducted him during his transfer to a new prison. Taking Crane to a cabin, Dick revealed that he knows Crane manipulated Jason into becoming Red Hood. Dick, recognizing that Jason will attempt to rescue Crane, lured him to the cabin for a confrontation. A fight ensued that ended with Jason and Crane's escape. Afterwards, Dick convinced Barbara to find Crane with the computer "Oracle", but Barbara deactivated it when Crane used her picture to hack into the system. Kory helped Dick track Crane, but did not catch him. At some point, Tim Drake, having deduced his secret identity, arrived at Wayne Manor to ask him if he could become the next Robin, with Dick refusing. A remorseful Jason contacted Dick to surrender himself and Crane at a condemned pumping station, but Crane secretly overheard their conversation. He and Kory attack Crane and Jason, but Crane tricked Kory into attacking him with her powers, causing an explosion that allowed his toxin to enter Gotham's water system. Crane manipulated Gotham's citizens against the Titans through a video that framed Dick and his team for the toxin outbreak. To help the police maintain the trust of the public, Dick had the team turn themselves in, but they were attacked at the station by corrupt officers, successfully escaping. With the Titans separated and forced into hiding, Crane and Jason take residence in Wayne Manor. A resurrected Donna and Rachel arrived in Gotham to assist the Titans. Afterwards, Dick accepted a challenge to face Jason in public. The confrontation saw Dick emerge victorious, but Jason escaped, with Dick wounded. A dying Dick is brought to the Lazarus Pit by Gar, with him emerging from the pit fully healed, inspired by visions of his father and a future daughter. Learning that Crane plans on killing the city's entire population, Jason teamed up with Dick, but they are unable to prevent Crane from obtaining explosives containing his toxin. After detonating one explosive, Crane threatens to set off the other bombs if the heroes are unable to solve his clues. Dick instead directly attacks Wayne Manor with Gar, Tim and a reformed Jason who helps deactivate the explosives and capture Crane. Bruce returns to Gotham and thanks Dick. He and the Titans decide to go back to San Francisco.

== Reception ==
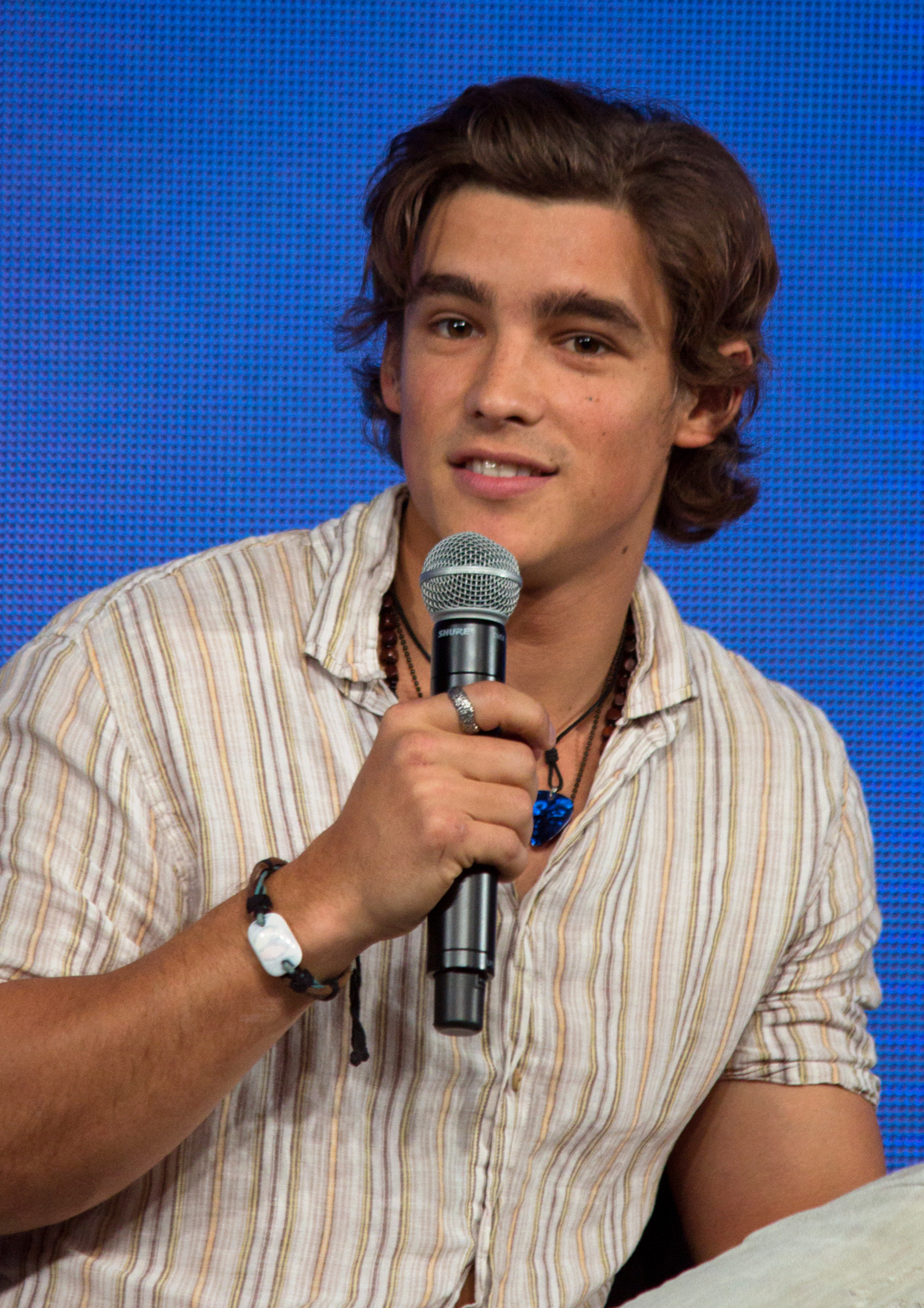
Thwaites at Nerd HQ 2014's panel for The Giver.

Brenton Thwaites' performance was praised by many critics, while the series as a whole met mixed reviews. Some also said that the dynamic between Dick and Teagan Croft's character Rachel Roth was a driving force in the first season of the show. One review of the show noted that Thwaites' character was a leading force into a complicated and messy show. Fans also noted that Thwaites acting was a contributing factor for the success of the show and the character, with his ability of expressing a variety of emotions, making Dick a more relatable person. Popular website Polygon.com wrote that "the show definitely has a main character, and it's Dick Grayson", naming him a "leader". For the third season, Collider wrote that the dynamic between Dick and Barbara Gordon gives some of the best moments of introspection the season has to offer, while in this season, Dick's role looks more like Batman's.

=== Awards and nominations ===
Year	Award	Category	Nominated work	Result	Ref.
2019	Teen Choice Awards	Choice Action TV Actor	Titans	Nominated	
