= Titans season 2 =

2019 season of American TV series

Titans
- Season 2
- Promotional poster
- Showrunner: Greg Walker
- Starring: Brenton Thwaites; Anna Diop; Teagan Croft; Ryan Potter; Curran Walters; Conor Leslie; Minka Kelly; Alan Ritchson; Chelsea Zhang; Joshua Orpin; Esai Morales
- No. of episodes: 13

Release
- Original network: DC Universe
- Original release: September 6 – November 29, 2019

Season chronology
- ← Previous; Season 1 Next → Season 3

The second season of the American superhero streaming television series Titans premiered on DC Universe on September 6, 2019, and concluded on November 29, consisting of 13 episodes. It was executive produced by Akiva Goldsman, Geoff Johns, Greg Berlanti, Sarah Schechter, and Greg Walker, with Walker serving as showrunner for the second consecutive season. Created by Goldsman, Johns, and Berlanti, the series is based on the DC Comics team Teen Titans. Brenton Thwaites, Anna Diop, Teagan Croft, and Ryan Potter return to the main cast from the previous season, joined by season 1 guest stars Curran Walters, Conor Leslie, Minka Kelly, and Alan Ritchson and series newcomers Chelsea Zhang, Joshua Orpin, and Esai Morales. The season also introduces Damaris Lewis, who would join the main cast in the following season. It is the only season to feature Zhang and Morales.

The season sees Dick Grayson (Thwaites) form a new Titans team comprising Rachel Roth (Croft), Gar Logan (Potter), and Jason Todd (Walters) in his original San Francisco base. Concurrent with the Titans' return, an old enemy resurfaces in the form of Deathstroke (Morales), whose past conflict with the original Titans team of Dick, Donna Troy (Leslie), Dawn Granger (Kelly), and Hank Hall (Ritchson) caused them to disband. As Deathstroke looks to eliminate the Titans, with his daughter Rose Wilson (Zhang) also taking part in the fight, the heroes face another threat from Cadmus Laboratories when they encounter runaway test subject Conner (Orpin). Meanwhile, Kory Anders (Diop) discovers she is being hunted by her sister Blackfire (Lewis).

A second season of Titans was confirmed in 2018 prior to the premiere of the first season. Filming began the following year and 13 episodes were announced, two more than the 11 episodes of its predecessor. The season was originally planned to feature H.I.V.E. as the Titans' enemies, while Dick would operate under his new mantle of Nightwing after assuming the identity in the initially intended season 1 finale. Before the start of filming, however, the original season 1 finale would be removed and reworked into the second season, which provided a new resolution to the previous season's story in its premiere episode. The second season was subsequently re-envisioned to depict Dick's gradual transformation into Nightwing, with Deathstroke replacing H.I.V.E. Its story was influenced by the 1984 comic arc "The Judas Contract" from Marv Wolfman and George Pérez's The New Teen Titans and the 2003 Teen Titans comics by Johns.

Critical reception to the second season was mixed. While episodes in the first half of the season received positive reviews, the premiere and later episodes were met with a more negative response for the plot, writing, character arcs, and story resolutions. The second season was the last to release on DC Universe following the repurposing of the service into comic distributor DC Universe Infinite and HBO Max's acquisition of its original programming.

== Episodes ==
No. overall	No. in season	Title	Directed by	Written by	Original release date	Prod. code
12	1	"Trigon"	Carol Banker	Akiva Goldsman & Geoff Johns & Greg Walker	September 6, 2019	T13.21651
Hank, Dawn, and Jason join Donna and Kory in attempting to stop Trigon, but they all succumb to his powers. Trigon breaks Rachel's will by having the heroes attempt to beat Gar to death. With Rachel under his control, Trigon begins to destroy life around him, starting with Angela. However, a still-alive Gar uses his friendship with Rachel to free her. In turn, Rachel saves Dick before defeating her father and freeing the rest. Afterwards, the heroes go their separate ways, with Dick accompanied by Jason, Rachel, and Gar. Dick meets with Bruce to reconcile and reestablish the Titans in San Francisco. Bruce agrees Dick may lead a new team under the condition Jason joins. Meanwhile, Deathstroke comes out of retirement when he learns the Titans have resurfaced.
13	2	"Rose"	Nathan Hope	Richard Hatem	September 13, 2019	T13.21652
Three months after Trigon's defeat, Dick continues to train his team at Titans Tower, where Rachel's powers begin to act strangely. Dick attempts to recruit a female metahuman he rescues into the Titans, despite her resistance to receiving help. Jason and Gar identify the young woman as Rose Wilson, Deathstroke's daughter. Hank and Dawn have retired to Wyoming, but tensions ensue when Hank discovers Dawn is continuing to operate as Dove. In Chicago, Kory and Donna fight crime together and capture rogue metahuman Shimmer. Dawn, Hank, and Donna are forced to reunite with Dick when an escaped Dr. Arthur Light begins targeting the Titans. Kory encounters fellow Tamaranean Faddei, who takes her captive.
14	3	"Ghosts"	Kevin Tancharoen	Tom Pabst	September 20, 2019	T13.21653
At the Titans Tower, Donna, Hank, and Dawn meet Dick, who notifies them that Deathstroke is pursuing Rose in the city. Rose reveals to Dick that she is attempting to assassinate Deathstroke because he killed her brother Jericho. Working together against the Titans, Deathstroke tells Dr. Light of his plan to separate the weaker members from the group. After Dr. Light escapes from the original team, Jason convinces Gar to search for him on their own. Jason defeats Dr. Light, but is ambushed by Deathstroke. Meanwhile, Faddei informs Kory that her sister Blackfire has ordered her return to Tamaran to become queen. A call from Rachel about losing control of her powers, however, prompts Kory to trap Faddei in her ship and travel back to her friends.
15	4	"Aqualad"	Glen Winter	Jamie Gorenberg	September 27, 2019	T13.21654
Five years before the present day, an assignment sends Deathstroke to San Francisco, where Jericho and his mother Adeline are hiding. Assisted by new member Garth, the original Titans capture Dr. Light. Garth and Donna harbor romantic feelings for each other, but Donna has resisted Garth's advances because the Amazons require that she return to Themyscira. After the two ultimately have a sexual encounter, Garth learns from Dick that Donna will be leaving immediately. When Garth appears before Donna at an airport to persuade her to stay, he is shot by Deathstroke. The surviving members of the team dedicate themselves to hunting Deathstroke down. A week later, Dick befriends Jericho, who is unaware that Dick seeks revenge against his father.
16	5	"Deathstroke"	Nick Gomez	Bianca Sams	October 4, 2019	T13.21655
After killing Dr. Light, Deathstroke informs the heroes that he will release Jason in exchange for Rose. The original Titans explain their situation to Kory after she arrives, as Gar, Rachel, and Rose eavesdrop on the conversation. Rose attempts to escape when she learns the team is considering surrendering her, causing her to nearly be killed by Rachel's unstable powers. Dick tells his teammates they will ambush Deathstroke under the guise of making the exchange, but secretly meets with Deathstroke in a skyscraper to offer his life for Jason's. Unmoved, Deathstroke reveals he has bound Jason to a scaffold rigged with explosives. Kory intervenes, but she and Dick are unable to stop Deathstroke from activating the explosives, sending Jason falling from the skyscraper.
17	6	"Conner"	Alex Kalymnios	Richard Hatem	October 11, 2019	T13.21656
In Metropolis, Subject 13 escapes from Cadmus Laboratories with Krypto, calling himself "Conner" after the nametag on a uniform he takes. Memories bring Conner to Lionel Luthor's Kansas home before Mercy Graves' team, accompanied by Dr. Eve Watson, attacks him. Defeating the team, Conner confronts Eve, who reveals she created him from the DNA of Superman and Lex Luthor. Eve takes Conner to the original Cadmus facility in San Francisco to help him better understand himself and the traits he shares with his DNA hosts. Urging him to flee, Eve also warns Conner not to draw attention to himself by using his powers, but Conner disregards her warning when he sees Jason falling. Upon saving Jason, Conner is shot with kryptonite bullets as Graves' team recaptures Krypto.
18	7	"Bruce Wayne"	Akiva Goldsman	Bryan Edward Hill	October 18, 2019	T13.21657
Dick leaves Titans Tower to search for Deathstroke while a hallucination of Bruce torments him over his guilty conscience. In Dick's absence, the team find items planted around the tower that remind them of painful memories. Jason is accused by the other Titans of being responsible, until Dick's search uncovers that Deathstroke has infiltrated the tower. With Jason contemplating suicide over the recent events, Dick admits to him that he is at fault for what has transpired because he killed Jericho. Eve arrives at the tower after freeing Krypto, where she finds Conner dying from kryptonite poisoning. When Eve informs Kory that Conner can only be healed by solar radiation, Kory uses her powers to save him.
19	8	"Jericho"	Toa Fraser	Kate McCarthy	October 25, 2019	T13.21658
In 2014, the Titans use their friendship with Jericho to obtain information on Deathstroke. Against Dawn's advice to leave him out of their battle, Dick recruits Jericho into the team upon discovering the powers he possesses. Jericho agrees to join when Dick tells him the truth about his father and the heroes' search for him. After learning of the Titans' contact with Jericho, Deathstroke severely injures Donna as a warning to stay away from his son. Dick responds by confronting Deathstroke amid a private meeting between him and Jericho, prompting a fight that ends in Deathstroke's favor. Before Deathstroke can kill Dick, however, Jericho is stabbed instead when he jumps in front of his father's blade. Afterwards, the Titans disband.
20	9	"Atonement"	Boris Mojsovski	Jeffrey David Thomas	November 1, 2019	T13.21659
After Dick reveals the truth about Jericho's death, all of the Titans except Gar leave Titans Tower. Jason and Rose depart together, while Rachel accompanies Donna before escaping to be on her own. Gar takes Conner out in public, leading to disaster when Conner attacks the police. Dick encounters Deathstroke, who declares their fight over if Dick remains isolated from his friends, but will eliminate the Titans if they reform. Heeding Deathstroke's warning, Dick has himself arrested by assaulting airport security. Believing their presence together harms others, Hank breaks up with Dawn. Kory learns she and Faddei are being hunted by Blackfire, who became queen after murdering their parents. Forced to kill Faddei when Blackfire takes over his body, Kory vows to pursue her sister.
21	10	"Fallen"	Kevin Sullivan	Jamie Gorenberg	November 8, 2019	T13.21660
Incarcerated at the Kane County Correctional Facility, Dick helps illegal immigrants Rafi and Luis escape prison before they can be deported to Corto Maltese. Rachel joins a group of runaways led by Dani after she uses her powers to save Dani from her abusive father Caleb, unaware she also caused his death. Conner is found at Titans Tower by Mercy, who convinces him to return to Cadmus by assuring him they can fix his personality shifts. Mercy takes an interest in Gar when he is brought to Cadmus with Conner and Krypto. Searching for Rachel, Donna uncovers the aftermath of Cadmus' assault on the tower.
22	11	"E.L._.O."	Millicent Shelton	Bianca Sams	November 15, 2019	T13.21661
While in isolation, Dick realizes Jericho is still alive inside of Deathstroke's body. Kory, Rachel, Donna, and Dawn are lured to the Elko Diner by Bruce in an effort to reunite the team. Learning of Dick's incarceration, Rachel and Kory head off to rescue him, while Donna and Dawn leave to search for Gar. When they raid the prison, Rachel and Kory find Dick's cell empty, with a message about Jericho being alive. Rose, growing close to Jason, informs Deathstroke that she is done helping him manipulate the Titans. Mercy has Gar subjected to an experiment that causes him to involuntarily turn violent upon command.
23	12	"Faux Hawk"	Larnell Stovall	Tom Pabst	November 22, 2019	T13.21662
Gar is unwillingly used by Cadmus to violently unleash his powers in public, which Mercy plans to culminate with an attack on a carnival. Donna and Dawn plan to stop Cadmus when they learn about Gar's and Conner's brainwashing. Unable to find Dick, Kory and Rachel return to San Francisco to also rescue Gar, while Kory's powers begin to diminish. Rose admits to Jason that she had been helping Deathstroke, causing Jason to leave her. With the Titans reuniting, Deathstroke contacts Rose to join him in eliminating them. After Adeline informs Dick of Deathstroke's plans and asks him to save Jericho, Dick obtains a new costume. In Wyoming, Hank struggles with drug addiction while working as a cage fighter.
24	13	"Nightwing"	Carol Banker	Richard Hatem & Greg Walker	November 29, 2019	T13.21663
Rose, joining Dick's side, kills Deathstroke while Jericho jumps into her body. Advertising him as a supersoldier to potential bidders, Mercy has the brainwashed Conner defeat Gar at the carnival before sending him after the Titans when they intervene. The team frees Gar and Conner from their brainwashing and defeat Cadmus, but Donna is killed when she prevents a damaged transmission tower from landing on civilians. In the aftermath, Rachel leaves for Themyscira with Donna's body in an attempt to resurrect her, Jason departs by himself, and Dick, Kory, Gar, Hank, Dawn, Rose, and Conner form a new Titans team. Elsewhere, Blackfire arrives on Earth by taking over the body of a pregnant woman.

== Cast and characters ==
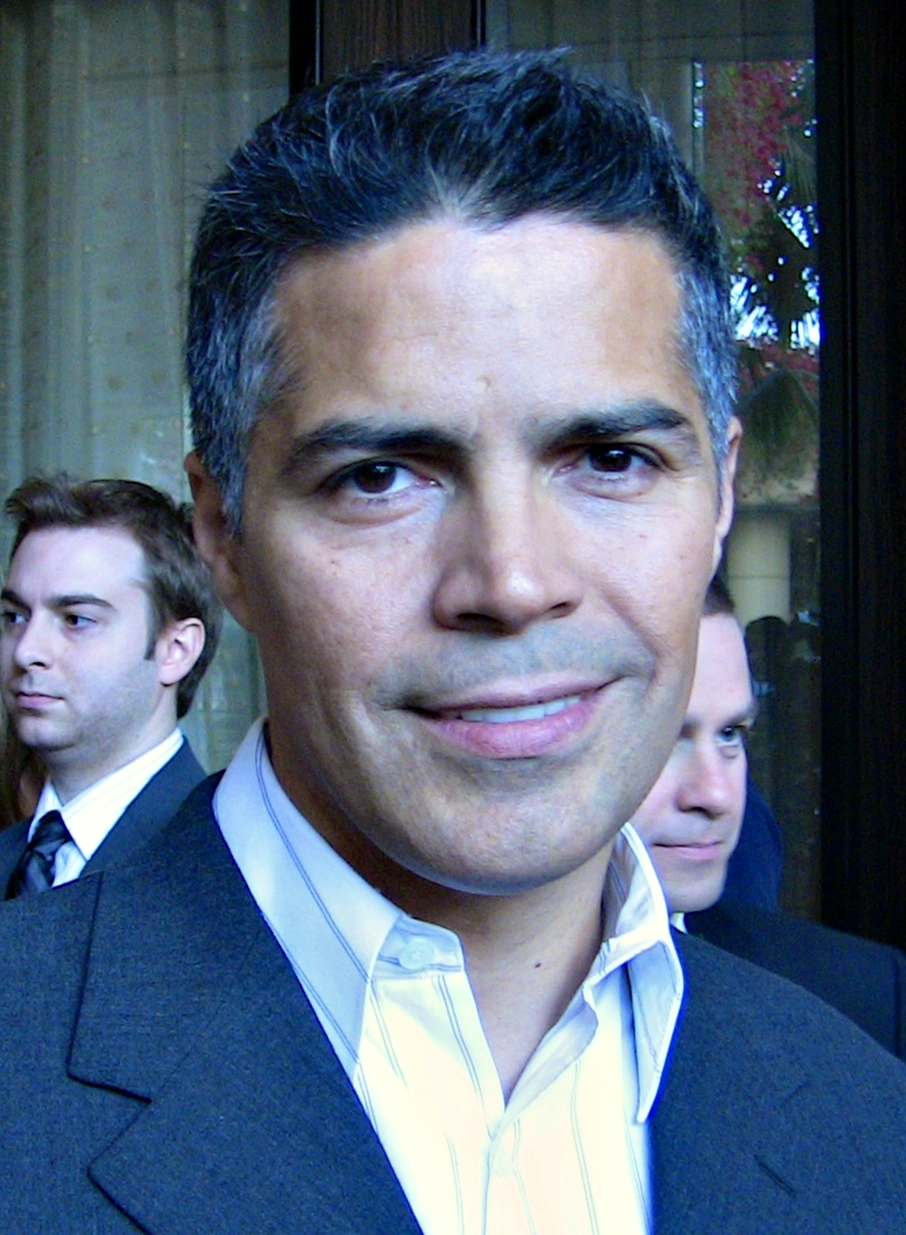
The second season features Esai Morales as Deathstroke.

=== Main ===
- Brenton Thwaites as Dick Grayson / Robin / Nightwing: The leader of the Titans and member of the original team
- Anna Diop as Koriand'r / Kory Anders: An extraterrestrial royal with the ability to absorb and redirect solar energy
- Teagan Croft as Rachel Roth: An empath deriving her powers from her demon father and member of the new Titans team
- Ryan Potter as Gar Logan: A shapeshifter capable of transforming into animals who joins the new Titans team
- Curran Walters as Jason Todd / Robin: Dick's successor as Robin, who becomes part of the new Titans team at Bruce's request
- Conor Leslie as Donna Troy / Wonder Girl: A half-Amazon who helped form the original Titans team
  - Afrodite Drossos as young Donna Troy
- Minka Kelly as Dawn Granger / Dove: The tactical half of her and Hank's vigilante duo, previously with the original Titans
- Alan Ritchson as Hank Hall / Hawk: A vigilante and former Titan serving as the aggressive half in his and Dawn's crimefighting duo
- Chelsea Zhang as Rose Wilson: Deathstroke's daughter, who shares his enhanced reflexes and regenerative healing
- Joshua Orpin as Subject 13 / Conner: A genetic clone of Superman and Lex Luthor, possessing the abilities and personality traits of both
- Esai Morales as Slade Wilson / Deathstroke: A biologically enhanced assassin who has a history with the original Titans

=== Recurring ===
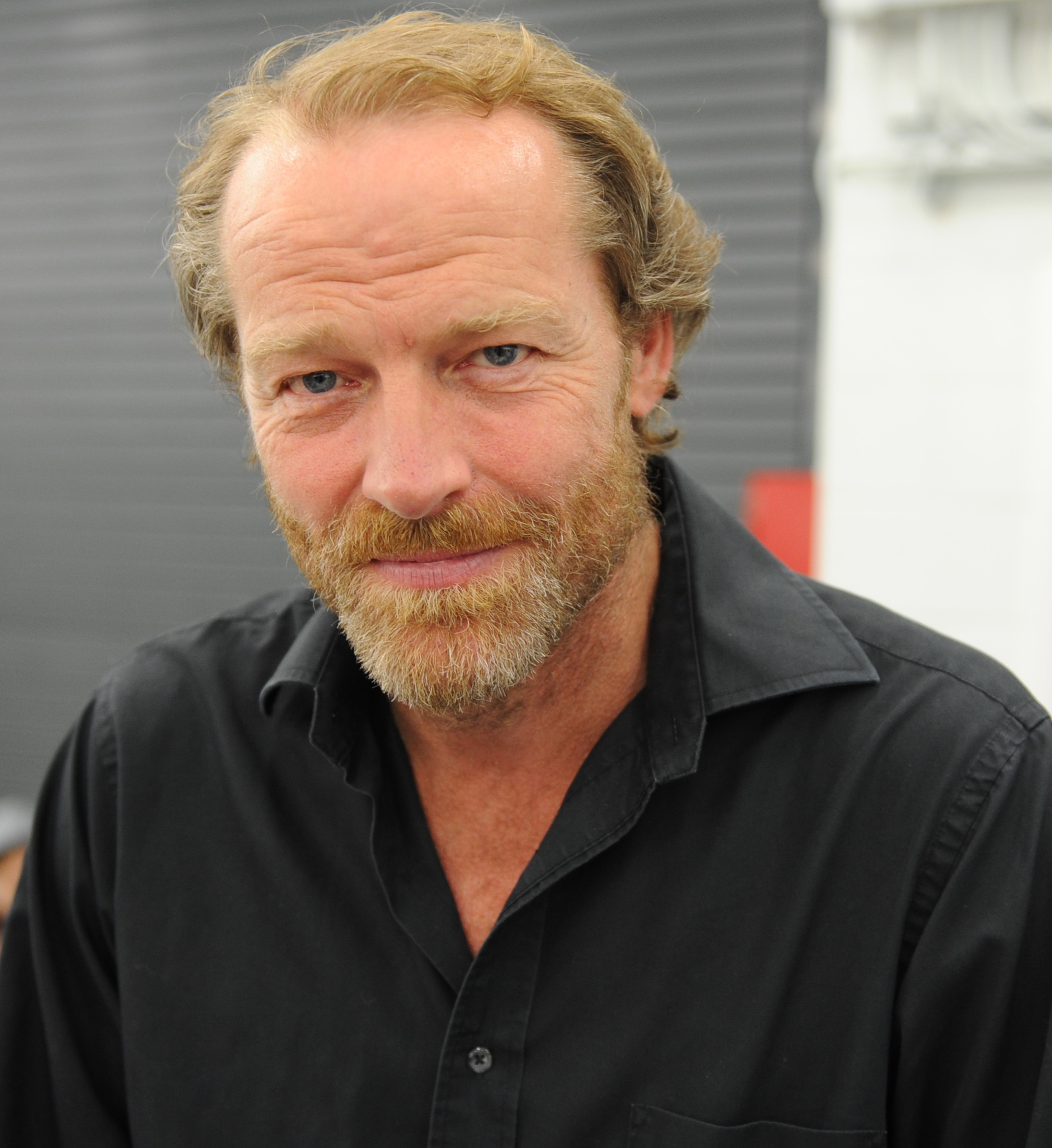
At 58, Iain Glen was the oldest actor to portray Bruce Wayne in live-action until Kevin Conroy's Arrowverse appearance the same year.

- Iain Glen as Bruce Wayne: A billionaire who moonlights as a feared vigilante in Gotham City and Dick's mentor
- Michael Mosley as Dr. Arthur Light: A former physicist who turned criminal after gaining the ability to control light energy
- Chella Man as Jericho: Deathstroke's mute son and Rose's half-brother, who has the power to possess other people's bodies through eye contact
- Mayko Nguyen as Adeline: Jericho's mother and Deathstroke's ex-wife
- Raoul Bhaneja as Walter Hawn: The vice president of special projects at Cadmus Laboratories
- Natalie Gumede as Mercy Graves: The personal security specialist to Lex Luthor, assigned to oversee Cadmus Laboratories
- Demore Barnes as William Wintergreen: Deathstroke's handler and friend

Dog actors Digby, Lacey, and Wrigley portray Krypto, a dog possessing Kryptonian powers who accompanies Conner.

=== Guest ===
- Seamus Dever as Trigon: An interdimensional demon with the power to destroy worlds and Rachel's father. Dever also portrays an ice cream truck driver and a drug supplier in the illusions created by Trigon.
- Rachel Nichols as Angela Azarath: Rachel's biological mother, who holds allegiance to Trigon
- Drew Van Acker as Garth / Aqualad: A member of the original Titans from Atlantis possessing hydrokinetic and enhanced physical abilities
- Robbie Jones as Faddei: A royal guard from Tamaran and former romantic interest of Kory
- Ann Magnuson as Jillian: An Amazon monitoring Donna
- Genevieve Angelson as Eve Watson: A scientist at Cadmus Laboratories who created Conner
- Damaris Lewis as Blackfire: A Tamaranean royal and Kory's sister
- Evan Jones as Len Armstrong: A prison guard at the Kane County Correctional Facility
- Orel De La Mota as Rafi: A Kane County inmate who illegally entered the United States after he fled Corto Maltese
- Julian Works as Luis: An illegal immigrant from Corto Maltese detained in Kane County with Rafi and Santos
- Rey Gallegos as Santos: Rafi and Luis's cellmate and fellow Corto Maltese illegal immigrant
- McKinley Freeman as Justin Cole: A psychiatrist who encounters Kory in Las Vegas
- Currie Graham as Stuart: The creator of Dick's costume, posing as a shoemaker
- Peter MacNeill as Lionel Luthor: A retired scientist and Lex Luthor's father
- Curtis Lum as Benny: A contact of Dick
- Elizabeth Whitmere as Peg: The sister of Hank and Dawn's farmhand
- Drew Scheid as Faux Hawk: A teenager who poses as Hawk
- Patrick Garrow as cage announcer: The announcer for Hank's cage fights
- Spencer Macpherson as Ellis: A recovering drug addict hired by Hank and Dawn to help manage their farm
- Hanneke Talbot as Selinda Flinders / Shimmer: A metahuman criminal with the ability to alter compounds and elements
- Sarah Deakins as Martha Kent: Superman's adoptive mother
- Oluniké Adeliyi as Mati Matisse: A burlesque dancer formerly in a relationship with Wintergreen
- Sydney Kuhne as Dani: A runaway fleeing from an abusive household
- Ishan Morris as Caleb: Dani's abusive father
- Natalie Morgan as Paris: A pregnant woman who becomes Blackfire's host body on Earth

Payne Novak portrays Lex Luthor and Clark Kent as children.

== Production ==
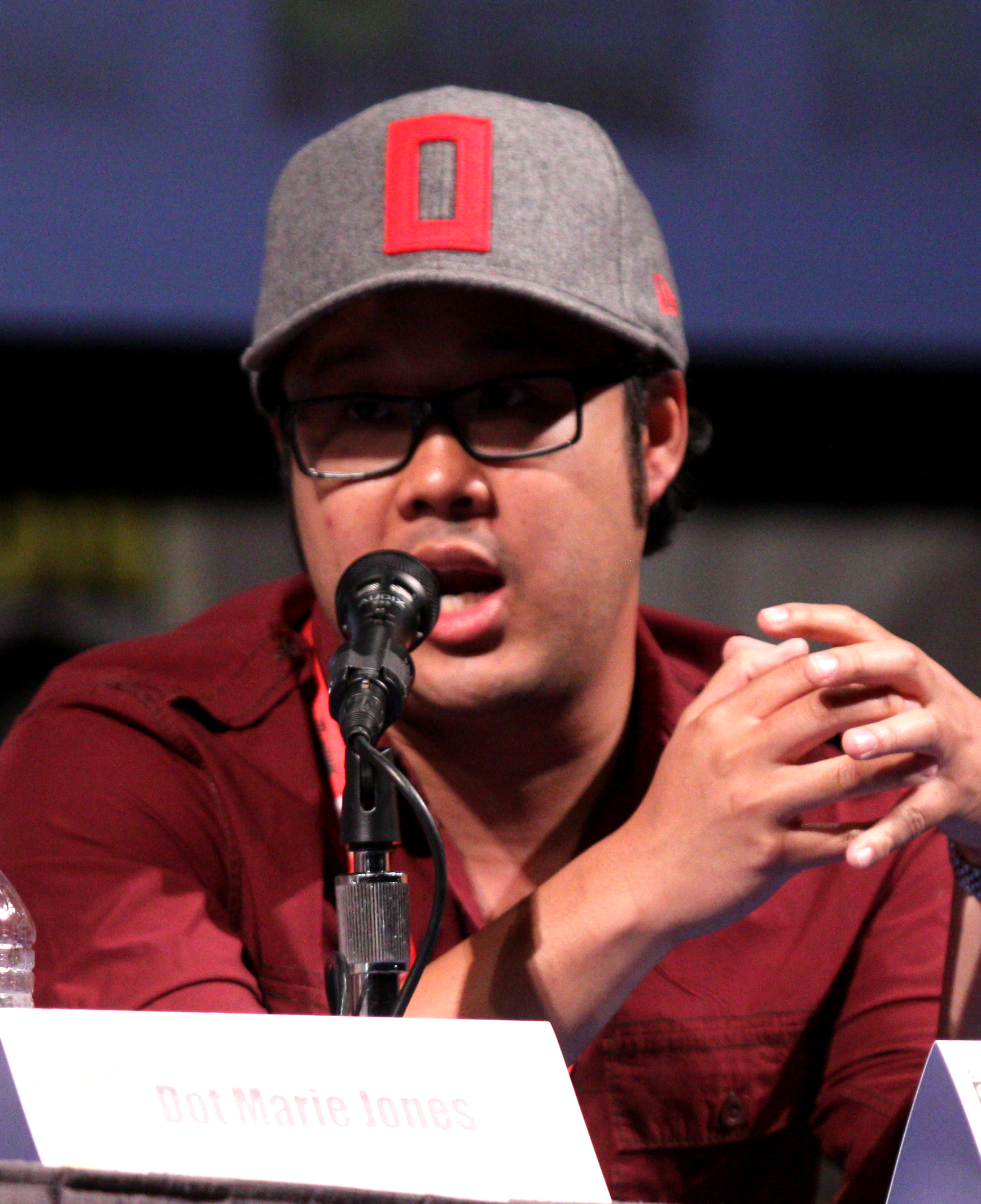
Kevin Tancharoen directed the season 2 episode "Ghosts".

=== Development ===
Ahead of the series' premiere at New York Comic Con in October 2018, Titans was renewed for a second season. Greg Walker returned as showrunner from the first season, who also served as an executive producer alongside Akiva Goldsman, Geoff Johns, Greg Berlanti, and Sarah Schechter.

The season was the last to release on DC Universe due to its original programming moving to HBO Max in 2021 and the repurposing of the service into comic distributor DC Universe Infinite.

=== Writing ===
The second season was initially planned to follow the events of the original season 1 finale, which would have seen Dick Grayson assume the identity of Nightwing and establish H.I.V.E. as the Titans' next adversaries. After the original season 1 finale was pulled, elements of the episode were given to the season 2 premiere, which became the resolution of season 1's Trigon story. H.I.V.E. was replaced by Deathstroke, while Dick's arc into Nightwing was re-envisioned to conclude in the season 2 finale.

=== Casting ===
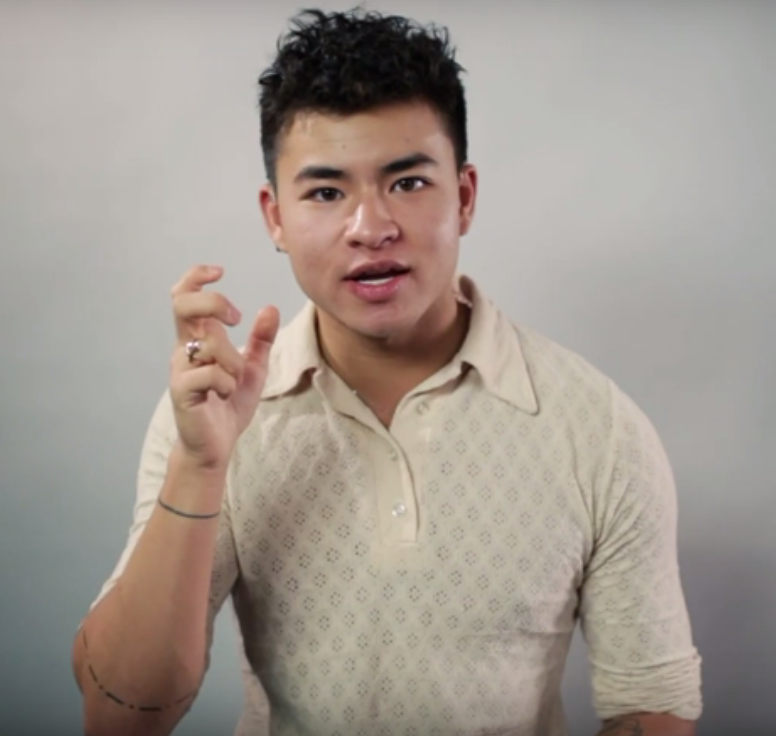
YouTube commentator Chella Man made his acting debut as Jericho in the second season of Titans.

Series regulars Brenton Thwaites, Anna Diop, Teagan Croft, and Ryan Potter reprise their roles from the first season as Dick Grayson, Kory Anders, Rachel Roth, and Gar Logan. Season 1 guest stars Curran Walters, Conor Leslie, Minka Kelly, and Alan Ritchson return as Jason Todd, Donna Troy, Dawn Granger, and Hank Hall, after being promoted to series regular status.

An additional cast for the second season was rounded up between February and October 2019. Joshua Orpin was cast as Conner, taking over for body double Brooker Muir in the first season. After the character was teased by co-creator Geoff Johns, Esai Morales was cast as Deathstroke, with Chella Man and Chelsea Zhang portraying his children Jericho and Rose. Iain Glen was cast as Bruce Wayne, marking the character's first physical appearance after being portrayed by stunt doubles in the first-season finale. Natalie Gumede and Drew Van Acker were cast as Mercy Graves and Garth, respectively. Other casting additions include Genevieve Angelson as Cadmus Laboratories scientist Dr. Eve Watson, Michael Mosley as Dr. Light, Oluniké Adeliyi as burlesque dancer Mati Matisse, Hanneke Talbot as Shimmer, Demore Barnes as Wintergreen, and Damaris Lewis as Kory's sister Blackfire.

=== Filming ===
Filming for the second season began on April 2, 2019, and concluded on September 20. Production was temporarily put on hold in July due to accidental death of special effects coordinator Warren Appleby; the season 2 premiere is dedicated in his memory.

== Release ==
=== Broadcast ===
The second season premiered in the United States through DC Universe on September 6 and concluded on November 29, 2019. Outside the United States, the second season became available for streaming via Netflix on January 10, 2020.

=== Home media ===
The second season was released digitally and to DVD and Blu-Ray on March 3, 2020.

== Reception ==
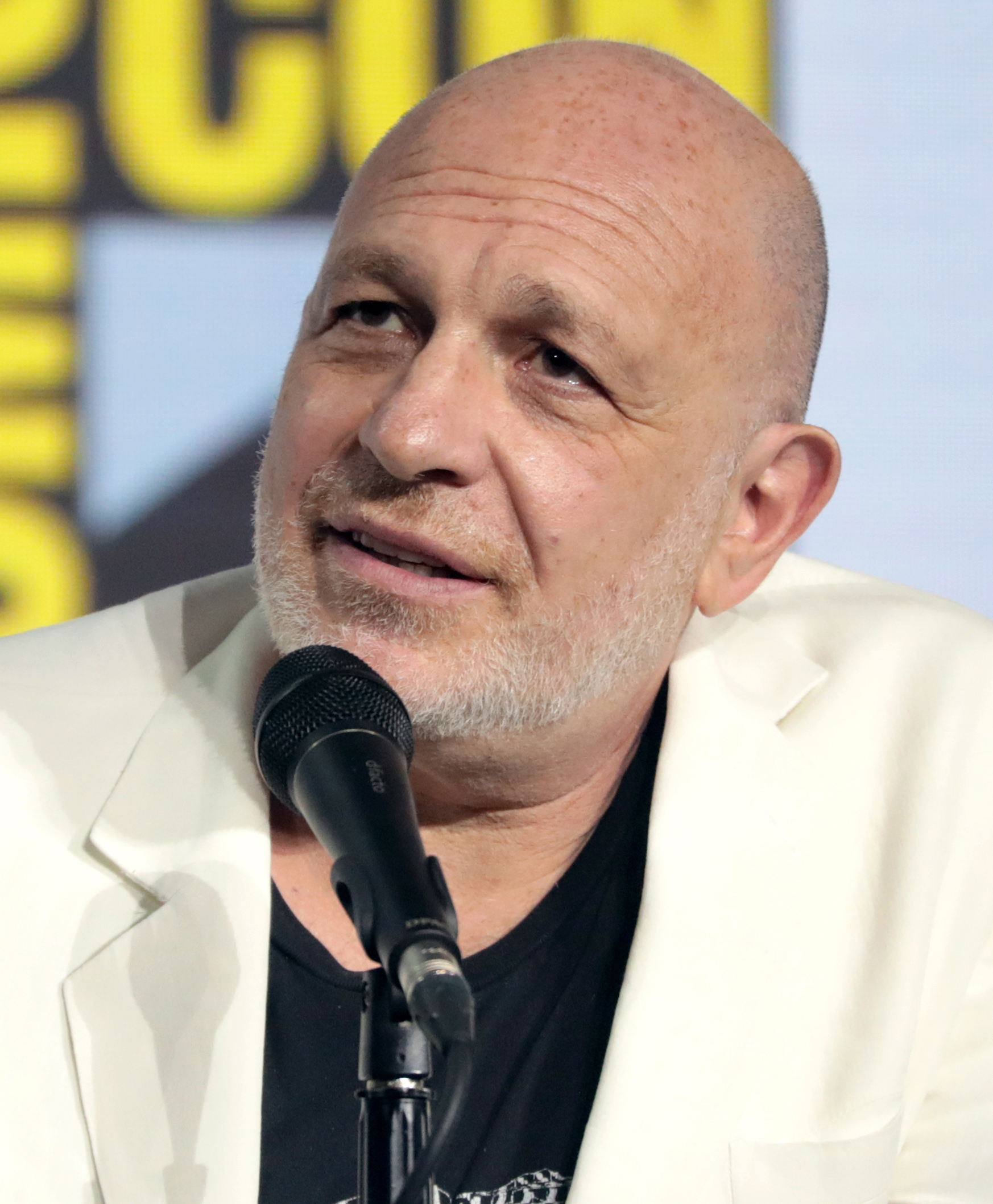
The season 2 premiere, written by executive producers Akiva Goldsman (pictured), Geoff Johns, and Greg Walker, was met with a mixed response.

On Rotten Tomatoes, the second season holds an 81% approval rating based on 21 reviews, with an average rating of 7 out of 10. The critical consensus reads: "Though Titans's sophomore season suffers from a slight slump at the start, it quickly resets itself, building on the momentum from its first season while laying fascinating framework for where the show could go".

The premiere episode "Trigon" was criticized for having story elements originally intended for the season 1 finale. Kevin Yeoman of Screen Rant wrote that the premiere "feels like two distinct episodes roughly stitched together, rather than a proper start to a new season" and "the show's simply carrying too much baggage at the start and is reaching for a conclusion too long after the ostensible end of season 1 to deliver much in the way of a fulfilling resolution or a promising new beginning". Giving the episode a 5.8/10, Jesse Schedeen of IGN called it "an extremely messy episode, with one half tasked with wrapping up Season 1's Trigon storyline and the other laying the groundwork for a new status quo and new villain" and "delivers a very anticlimactic finish to Season 1's story", although he found promise for future episodes. Den of Geek reviewer Aaron Sagers said the premiere "would have served as an excellent season 1 finale", but concluded that "it feels quite a bit like a much-needed course correction for this series" and gave it a 3.5/5.

Following the premiere, early episodes of the season earned a positive reception. In a review for the second episode "Rose", Forbes contributor Linda Maleh called it "the real season premiere" and wrote, "season 2 has taken the best things about season 1, and elevated them". Praising the sixth episode "Conner" and Joshua Orpin's performance in the titular role, Sagers said that "it is a strong introduction of the anticipated character, and Titans makes up for the fact we've waited so long in the season for it". Schedeen gave the eighth episode "Jericho" a 9.3/10, which he described as "easily the strongest installment of Titans: Season 2, and a clear contender for the series' best episode overall".

However, the later episodes were received more negatively. In a review for the 11th episode "E.L._.O.", Charles Pulliam-Moore of Gizmodo wrote that "Titans seemingly lost its focus" after the eighth episode and "with just two episodes to go, it doesn't seem possible that the writers are going to be able to wrap things up in satisfying or interesting ways". For the finale "Nightwing", Pulliam-Moore called it "a travesty of epic proportions", criticizing how the episode concluded the season's storylines. The death of Donna Troy in the finale was widely panned as illogical and unnecessary, with several reviewers questioning if electrical discharge from a transmission tower would have been sufficient to kill the character. Although giving the overall episode a 3.5/5, Sagers commented: "Even if I were to accept that Donna couldn't withstand that electrical charge, and even if I could explain why the super-boy [Conner] didn't rush to stop the falling tower, the death played out in cheap fashion, like yet another box that had to be ticked for the finale". Entertainment Weekly's Christian Holub said that "Donna Troy's last-minute death felt so stupidly unnecessary that I can't help but throw up my hands at this whole season finale", describing the scene as "such a stupid death I honestly thought it was a joke at first". Donna's actress Conor Leslie agreed with the criticism during a 2021 interview, noting the episode aired shortly before a Wonder Woman 1984 trailer that depicted Diana Prince unaffected by lightning.
