= Titans season 3 =

2021 season of American TV series

Titans
- Season 3
- Promotional poster
- Showrunner: Greg Walker
- Starring: Brenton Thwaites; Anna Diop; Teagan Croft; Ryan Potter; Conor Leslie; Curran Walters; Joshua Orpin; Damaris Lewis; Savannah Welch; Minka Kelly; Alan Ritchson; Vincent Kartheiser
- No. of episodes: 13

Release
- Original network: HBO Max
- Original release: August 12 – October 21, 2021

Season chronology
- ← Previous; Season 2 Next → Season 4

The third season of the American superhero streaming television series Titans premiered on HBO Max on August 12, 2021, and concluded on October 21, consisting of 13 episodes. It was executive produced by Akiva Goldsman, Geoff Johns, Greg Walker, Greg Berlanti, Sarah Schechter, and Richard Hatem, with Walker serving as showrunner for the third consecutive season. Developed by Goldsman, Johns, and Berlanti, the series is based on the DC Comics team Teen Titans. Brenton Thwaites, Anna Diop, Teagan Croft, Ryan Potter, Conor Leslie, Curran Walters, Joshua Orpin, Minka Kelly, and Alan Ritchson return to the main cast from the previous season, joined by season 2 guest star Damaris Lewis and series newcomers Savannah Welch and Vincent Kartheiser. The season also introduces Jay Lycurgo, who would join the main cast the following season. It is the final season to feature longtime cast members Leslie, Kelly, and Ritchson, the final to feature Lewis, and the only to feature Welch and Kartheiser.

In the third season, the Titans team of Dick Grayson (Thwaites), Kory Anders (Diop), Gar Logan (Potter), Conner (Orpin), Dawn Granger (Kelly), and Hank Hall (Ritchson) travel to Gotham City after learning that their former teammate Jason Todd (Walters) was murdered. Tasked with protecting the city in the absence of Bruce Wayne (Iain Glen), the Titans find themselves targeted by a resurrected Jason, now calling himself Red Hood. Dick, working alongside former vigilante partner and love interest Barbara Gordon (Welch) in her new role as police commissioner, is forced to receive assistance from incarcerated criminal Jonathan Crane (Kartheiser) in stopping Jason. Further tensions emerge when Kory's younger sister Blackfire (Lewis) takes up residence with the team, despite conflict between her and Kory. Meanwhile, Titan Rachel Roth (Croft) trains with the Amazons in Themyscira as she attempts to resurrect fallen teammate Donna Troy (Leslie).

Titans' third season was confirmed shortly before the conclusion of the second season in 2019. Filming was scheduled to begin by the spring of the following year, with the season premiering on DC Universe in late 2020, but due to the COVID-19 pandemic, production was delayed before the start of filming. Production resumed by October 2020 and concluded by June 2021. The third season was the first to release on HBO Max following its acquisition of DC Universe's original programming and the repurposing of DC Universe into comic distributor DC Universe Infinite. In addition to having elements from Marv Wolfman and George Pérez's 1980s The New Teen Titans and Johns' 2003 Teen Titans comics, the season is inspired by the Batman comic storylines "A Death in the Family" (1988) by Jim Starlin and Jim Aparo, "No Man's Land" (1999) by Jordan B. Gorfinkel, and "Under the Hood" (2004–2006) by Judd Winick and Doug Mahnke.

Reviews of the third season have been positive, with critics regarding it as an improvement over past seasons.

== Episodes ==
No. overall	No. in season	Title	Directed by	Written by	Original release date	Prod. code
25	1	"Barbara Gordon"	Carol Banker	Richard Hatem & Geoff Johns	August 12, 2021	T13.22451
After learning the Joker killed Jason, Dick returns to Gotham City. He discovers Jason had been working with chemistry equipment, which was used to create an unidentified drug. Reuniting with Bruce and Police Commissioner Barbara Gordon, Dick begins to question Bruce's mental state over losing Jason. His suspicions are confirmed when he finds out the Joker was murdered by Bruce, who departs after tasking Dick with protecting Gotham. The news of Jason's death also reaches Tim Drake, a young Gotham resident who idolizes Batman. Meanwhile, the Titans team of Kory, Gar, and Conner continue to fight crime in San Francisco. Kory begins to experience hallucinations that result in her blacking out.
26	2	"Red Hood"	Carol Banker	Tom Pabst	August 12, 2021	T13.22452
To help Dick protect Gotham, Kory, Gar, Conner, and Dawn arrive at the team's new base in Wayne Manor. Hank also joins, despite tensions between him and Dawn. In Bruce's absence, a mysterious figure extorts Gotham's mob bosses into becoming their enforcer. When the figure has individuals wearing red hoods perform criminal acts, Barbara informs Dick that the incarcerated Jonathan Crane has been serving as a police consultant. Through Crane's help, the Titans are able to track down the figure to an abandoned munitions building. Dick engages in a fight with the figure, who is revealed to be a still-alive Jason. Jason identifies himself as Red Hood before escaping.
27	3	"Hank & Dove"	Millicent Shelton	Jamie Gorenberg	August 12, 2021	T13.22453
Hank is lured into a trap by Jason, who implants an explosive device in his chest. As Hank's heartbeats bring the device closer to detonating, Jason offers to deactivate it if the Titans steal gold bars being delivered to a bank. Dick, refusing Jason's demand, discovers the device was created by Bruce. Using the device's schematics, Dick gives Conner the task of creating a deactivator, while Dawn, having rekindled her relationship with Hank, steals the gold bars. Dawn and Jason meet at a secluded location, where Jason coerces her into saving Hank by shooting him with a gun he provides. Dawn pulls the trigger, but the gun instead detonates the device, killing Hank, as Conner arrives too late to use his deactivator.
28	4	"Blackfire"	Millicent Shelton	Stephanie Coggins	August 19, 2021	T13.22454
In the aftermath of Hank's death, Dawn leaves the Titans. Crane is removed from Arkham after Jason orders his assassination, but Dick abducts him during his transfer to a new prison. Taking Crane to the cabin where he trained, Dick reveals he knows Crane manipulated Jason into becoming Red Hood. Dick, recognizing Jason will attempt to rescue Crane, lures him to the cabin for a confrontation. A fight ensues that ends with Jason and Crane's escape. Meanwhile, Kory's visions lead Gar and her to Blackfire in custody at a government facility run by Dr. Artie Kind. Unable to abandon her sister, Kory frees Blackfire, who accompanies her back to Wayne Manor.
29	5	"Lazarus"	Boris Mojsovski	Bryan Edward Hill	August 26, 2021	T13.22455
Three months before freeing Crane, Jason has nightmares of an ominous warning from Donna. Bruce responds by placing Jason under therapy from Leslie Thompkins, a former colleague of Crane. When Jason learns Bruce intends to remove him as Robin, he begins helping Crane in exchange for a drug that will eliminate his fear. After Crane manipulates Jason into being killed by the Joker, he has Jason resurrected with a Lazarus Pit and creates a toxin to control him as Red Hood. Jason uses his new identity to help his friend Molly Jensen rescue missing orphan children, despite Molly recognizing his personality change. In the present, Crane tells Jason of his plan to take over Gotham by engulfing the city in fear that only they can control.
30	6	"Lady Vic"	Nick Gomez	Joshua Levy & Prathi Srinivasan	September 2, 2021	T13.22456
Six years before the present, a romantically involved Dick and Barbara engage in a series of museum heists. The robberies lead to them battling the assassin Lady Vic, where they inadvertently cause the death of her partner. In the present, Crane has Lady Vic steal a medical device that will rapidly distribute his drug. Jason circumvents Crane's authority by giving the drug to street criminals, resulting in a wave of violence. Barbara survives an attack from Lady Vic, but Lady Vic succeeds in obtaining a picture of her for Crane. Despite mounting tensions between her and Kory, Blackfire assists the Titans by uncovering Crane is working with Gotham's mob bosses.
31	7	"51%"	Nick Gomez	Kate McCarthy	September 9, 2021	T13.22457
Recognizing Jason still fears Dick, Crane has him drugged. Dick convinces Barbara to find Crane with the computer Oracle, but Barbara deactivates it when Crane uses her picture to hack into the system. Kory and Blackfire visit mob boss Valeska Nox, who offers to give up Crane's location if they reunite her with her son Michael. When Valeska shoots Michael for being an FBI informant, Kory retaliates by killing her. Nevertheless, Kory and Blackfire help Dick locate Crane's drug plant through interrogating one of Valeska's henchmen. The Titans destroy the facility, forcing Crane to flee with Jason. In the aftermath, Dick and Barbara resume their relationship. Seeking to help Jason, Gar tracks down Molly. Blackfire informs Kory that she killed their parents in self-defense.
32	8	"Home"	Larnell Stovall	Tom Pabst	September 16, 2021	T13.22458
After a sexual encounter, Conner and Blackfire attempt to help Kory with new visions she begins experiencing. Without drugs to keep him under control, Jason turns against Crane. Tim, having deduced Dick's secret identity, arrives at Wayne Manor in an unsuccessful attempt to become the next Robin. A remorseful Jason contacts Dick to surrender himself and Crane at a condemned pumping station, while Crane secretly overhears their conversation. Tim also follows Jason, but is shot outside the pumping station by Crane. While the rest of the team tends to Tim, Dick and Kory pursue Jason and Crane in the facility. Crane tricks Kory into attacking him with her powers, causing an explosion that allows his toxin to enter Gotham's water system.
33	9	"Souls"	Boris Mojsovski	Richard Hatem	September 23, 2021	T13.22459
Training with the Amazons in Themyscira, Rachel's efforts to resurrect Donna prove unsuccessful. Tim awakens in the afterlife, where he encounters Donna and Hank. Banding together against demonic ghouls that steal dead souls, Hank leads the group to a bridge rumored to revive the deceased. Hank is forced to stay behind during a battle with the ghouls when the bridge collapses, but Donna and Tim successfully cross through the bridge to escape the afterlife. As a departing Rachel discovers Donna's body gone, Donna saves Bruce from a suicide attempt. Hank reunites with Don, prompting them to team up in protecting other souls from the ghouls.
34	10	"Troubled Water"	Larnell Stovall	Melissa Brides	September 30, 2021	T13.22460
Crane manipulates Gotham's citizens against the Titans through a video that frames Dick and his team for the toxin outbreak, while also presenting Red Hood as the city's new hero. To help the police maintain the trust of the public, Dick has the team turn themselves in, but they are attacked at the station by corrupt officers under the command of Fletcher, who received a bribe from Jason. The team escapes, but Barbara is arrested for shooting Fletcher to save Dick. With the Titans separated and forced into hiding, Crane and Jason take residence in Wayne Manor. Attempting to heal her sister's injuries from the attack, Kory has her powers absorbed by Blackfire. Gar reunites with a newly-arrived Rachel. Donna also arrives in Gotham after the Amazons test her leadership abilities.
35	11	"The Call Is Coming from Inside the House"	Carol Banker	Stephanie Coggins	October 7, 2021	T13.22461
Dick accepts a challenge to face Jason in public. The confrontation sees Dick emerge victorious, but a crowd of bystanders attack him. Jason retreats to Wayne Manor, where he discovers Crane has turned violent from a psychotic break. Instigated by information that Gar uncovered, Rachel finds the Lazarus Pit before her powers alert her of Dick being in danger. A reunited Donna and Tim learn Crane is plotting to have corrupt officers assault Tim's city block, prompting Donna to lead the residents in fighting back. After being shot, Kory experiences a vision that reveals her parents had Blackfire's powers transferred into her. Kory emerges from the vision with a new ability to generate blue light.
36	12	"Prodigal"	Carol Banker	Jamie Gorenberg & Bryan Edward Hill	October 14, 2021	T13.22462
A dying Dick is brought to the Lazarus Pit by Gar after he takes the form of a bat. Dick emerges from the Pit fully healed, inspired by visions of his late father and a future daughter. Learning Crane plans on killing the city's entire population, Jason teams up with Dick, but they are unable to prevent Crane from obtaining explosives containing his toxin. Donna leads Tim and his family out of Gotham, despite Tim's insistence on helping protect the city. After escaping her holding cell, Barbara attempts to reactivate Oracle. Blackfire arrives at Kind's facility with Conner, where she discovers her ship is being held. When Kory informs her of their parents' deception, Blackfire decides to return to Tamaran, but Conner's romantic feelings for her cause him to destroy the ship.
37	13	"Purple Rain"	Chad Lowe	Richard Hatem & Greg Walker	October 21, 2021	T13.22463
A.R.G.U.S. agents led by Vee rescue Barbara. Joined by Tim, the Titans reunite. After detonating one explosive, Crane threatens to set off the other bombs if the heroes are unable to solve his clues. Dick instead directly attacks Wayne Manor with Gar, Jason, and Tim, who help deactivate the explosives and capture Crane. The remaining Titans turn the Lazarus Pit into rainfall that resurrects those killed by the first bomb. Bruce returns to Gotham, where Jason makes amends with him before departing. Conner helps design a new ship for Blackfire, who bids farewell to him and Kory. Leaving the team to find Dawn, Donna is asked to join A.R.G.U.S. Tim accompanies the Titans as they return to San Francisco in an RV. Before leaving, Dick has Rachel use the Lazarus Pit's dark magic on Crane.

== Cast and characters ==
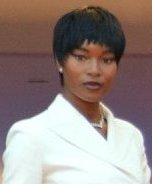
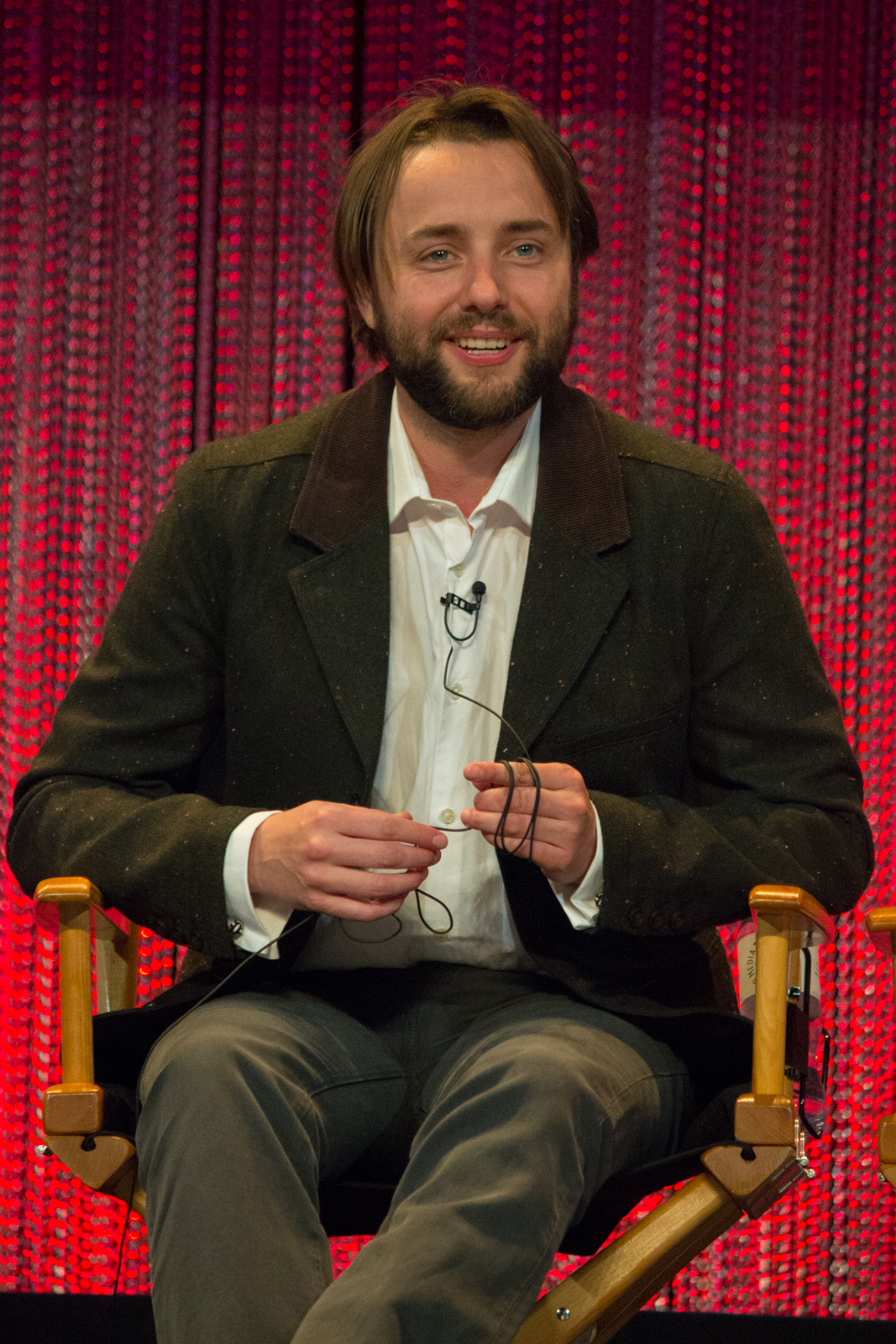
Damaris Lewis and Vincent Kartheiser (top to bottom) portray season 3 characters Blackfire and Jonathan Crane.

=== Main ===
- Brenton Thwaites as Dick Grayson / Nightwing / Robin
  - Viktor Sawchuk and Taj Levey as young Dick Grayson (Note: The young Dick Grayson and his father are also played by Tomaso Sanelli and Randolf Hobbs in archive footage from the first season.)
- Anna Diop as Koriand'r / Kory Anders / Starfire
- Teagan Croft as Rachel Roth / Raven
- Ryan Potter as Gar Logan / Beast Boy
- Conor Leslie as Donna Troy
- Curran Walters as Jason Todd / Robin / Red Hood
- Joshua Orpin as Conner / Superboy
- Damaris Lewis as Komand'r / Blackfire
- Savannah Welch as Barbara Gordon
- Minka Kelly as Dawn Granger / Dove
- Alan Ritchson as Hank Hall / Hawk
- Vincent Kartheiser as Dr. Jonathan Crane

=== Recurring ===
- Iain Glen as Bruce Wayne
- Jay Lycurgo as Tim Drake
- McKinley Freeman as Justin Cole
- Karen Robinson as Margarita Vee
- Eve Harlow as Molly Jensen
- Ryan Allen as Jack Drake
- Chantria Tram as Janet Drake
- Vinson Tran as Stephen Chen

Dog actors Pepsi, Wrigley, and Ziva portray Krypto in the third season.

=== Guest ===
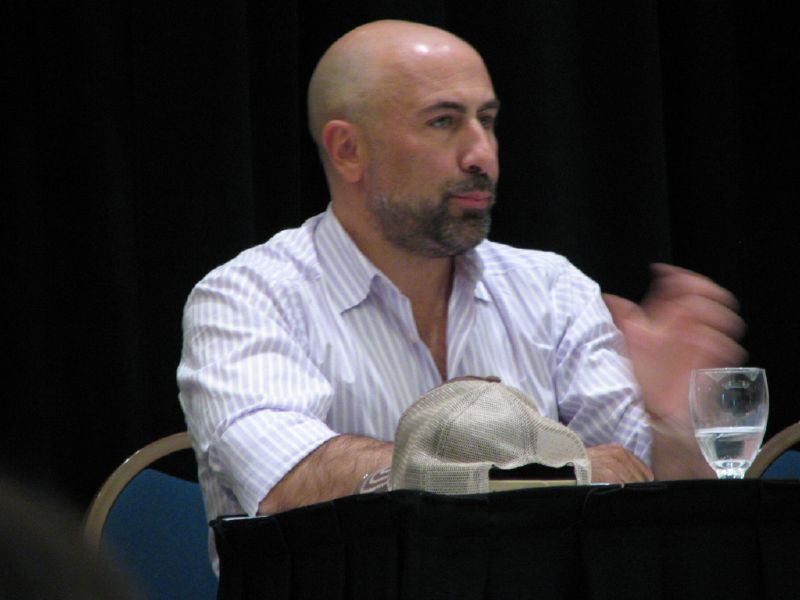
The character Oracle was re-envisioned from Barbara Gordon's alias to a computer voiced by Carlo Rota.

- Wendy Crewson as Valeska Nox
- Paulino Nunes as Sanchez
- Krista Bridges as Leslie Thompkins
- Dylan Trowbridge as Pete Hawkins
- Kimberly-Sue Murray as Lady Vic
- Raven Dauda as GCPD Administrator
- Tenika Davis as Myrrha
- Elliot Knight as Don Hall / Dove
- Greg Bryk as Fletcher
- Andrew Moodie as King Myand'r
- Dov Tiefenbach as Gizmo
- Rose Napoli as Trina Holmes
- Mal Dassin as Telly Rupp
- Al McFoster as Rafelson Roberts
- Anthony J. Mifsud as Santiago Perez
- Danny Smith as Tod
- Kris Siddiqi as Dr. Artie Kind
- Maxime Savaria as Bivens
- Benjamin Liddell as Michael Nox
- Carlo Rota as the voice of Oracle
- Valerie Buhagiar as Lydia
- Jasmin Geljo as Train Conductor
- Asha James as Queen Luand'r
- Sean Clement as John Grayson

A voice over of poet W. H. Auden is provided by Benedict Campbell. The Joker is portrayed by an uncredited stand-in. Esai Morales and Chella Man appear in archive footage from the second season as Deathstroke and Jericho, while April Brown Chodkowski appears as Mary Grayson in archive footage from the first season.

== Production ==
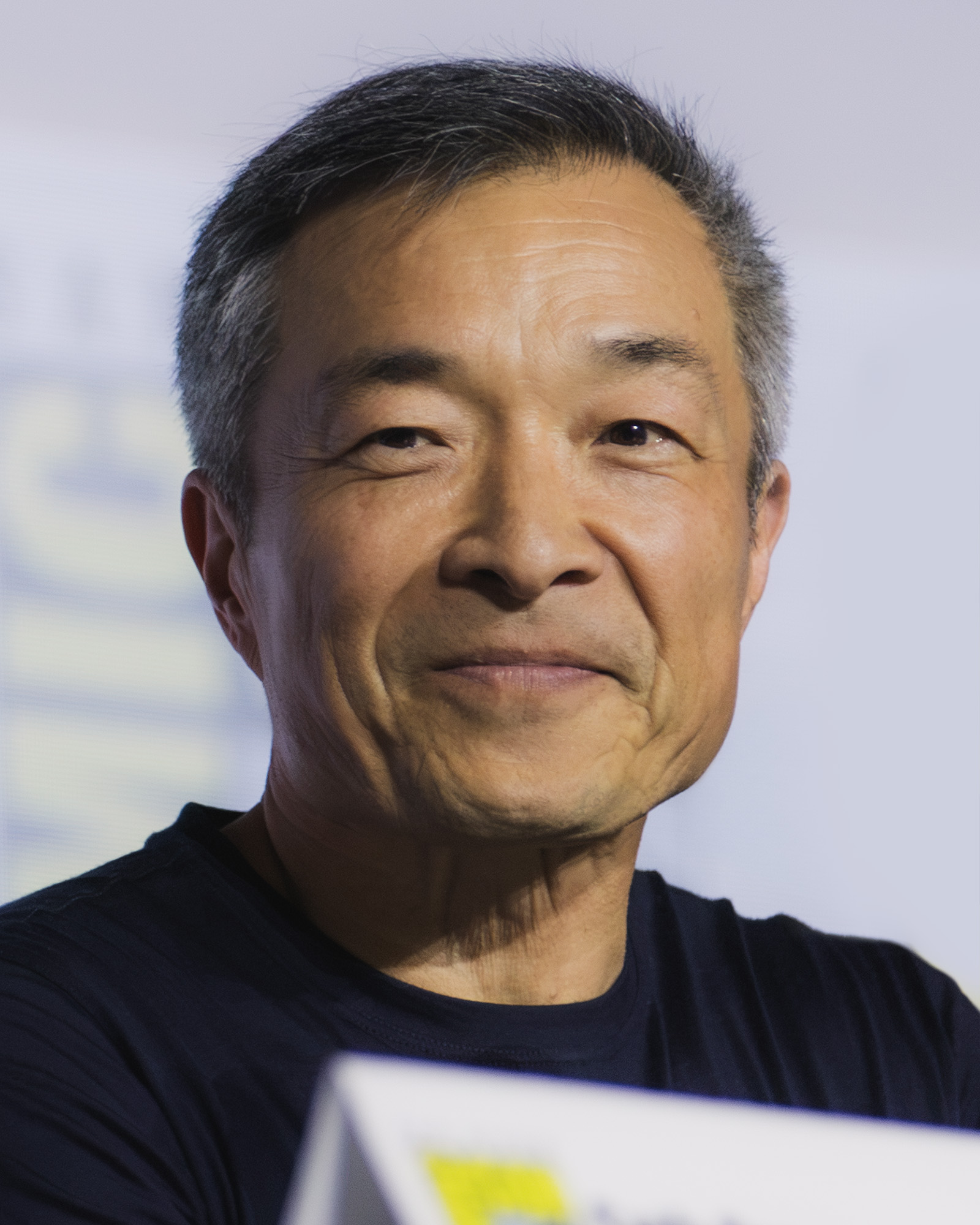
Following a reorganization at DC, chief creative officer Jim Lee revealed that Titans would move to HBO Max.

=== Development ===
A few weeks before the second season concluded, Titans was renewed for a third season in November 2019. The filming was scheduled to begin earlier in 2020, but the COVID-19 pandemic in March forced production to be temporarily shut down. Executive producer Akiva Goldsman stated two months later that filming on the third season had not yet occurred, but would begin "as soon as possible".

During the production delay, DC Chief Creative Officer Jim Lee revealed that the series would be moving from DC Universe to HBO Max, which launched in 2020. The third season was the first to premiere on HBO Max.

=== Writing ===
Writers Prathi Srinivasan, Joshua Levy, and Stephanie Coggins joined the third season in 2020, alongside returning writers Jamie Gorenberg, Tom Pabst, Kate McCarthy, and Richard Hatem.

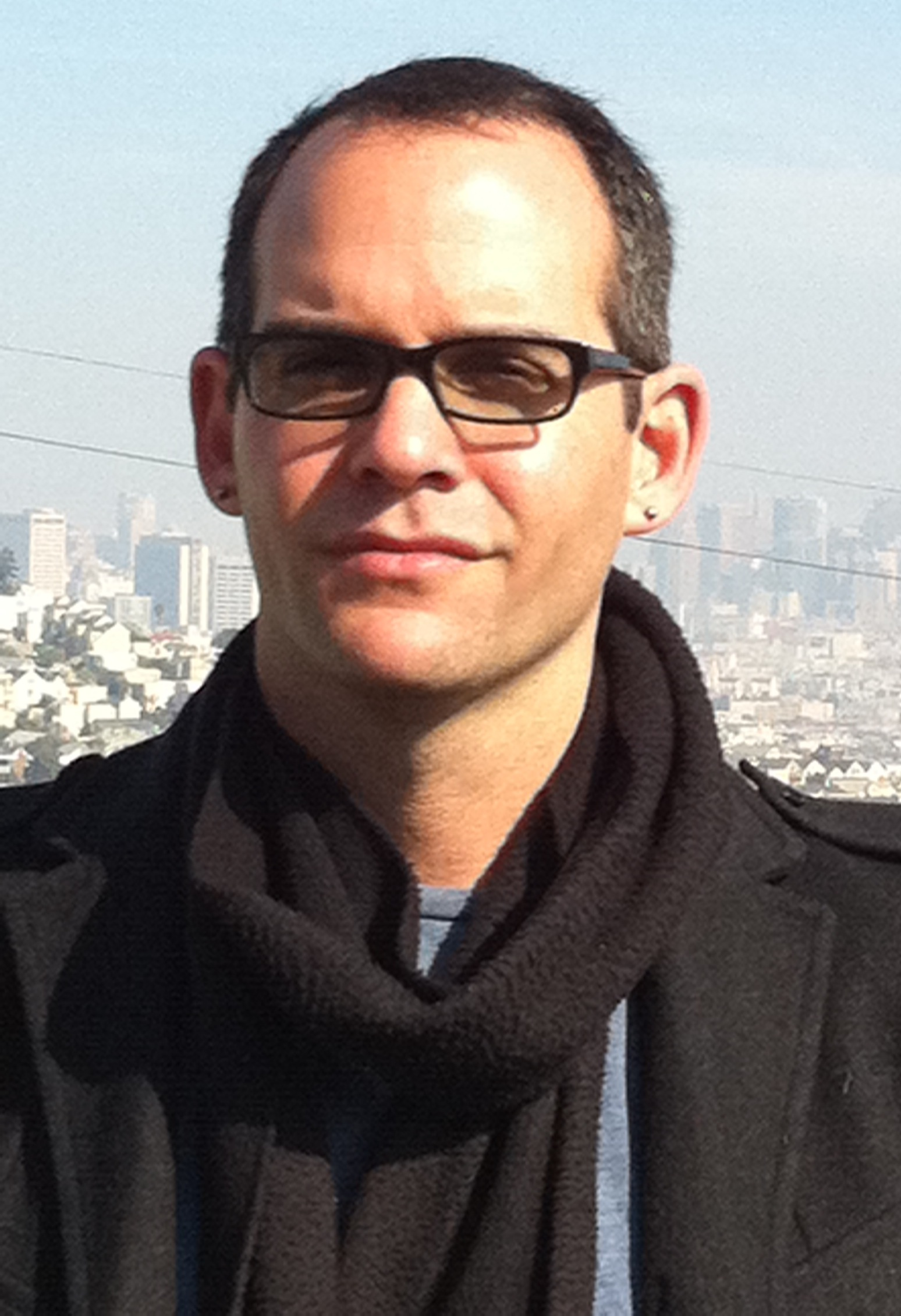
The third season adapts "Batman: Under the Hood" by Judd Winick (pictured) and Doug Mahnke.

The third season takes place in Gotham City and introduces Red Hood, Jonathan Crane, and Barbara Gordon. San Francisco was originally intended to be setting from the second season, but filming being pushed into the fall and winter months resulted in the story being moved to Gotham. Donna Troy was brought back for season 3, despite the character's death in the previous season.

Walker described Gotham as "a huge character" in season 3 that "brings out leadership qualities that [Dick] has to assess to see whether they're his own - true Nightwing - or are they patterns [inherited from] a father who he needs to differentiate himself from?". For Barbara, Walker noted she and Dick would be reckoning with the legacy of James Gordon and Bruce Wayne in the third season. He also compared Crane to Hannibal Lecter as an incarcerated villain who helps the police capture other criminals, while being able to exploit fear.

=== Casting ===
Series regulars Brenton Thwaites, Anna Diop, Teagan Croft, Ryan Potter, Conor Leslie, Curran Walters, Joshua Orpin, Alan Ritchson, and Minka Kelly reprise their roles as Dick Grayson, Kory Anders, Rachel Roth, Gar Logan, Donna Troy, Jason Todd, Conner, Hank Hall, and Dawn Granger, alongside Damaris Lewis as Blackfire, who was promoted to series regular status after guest starring in the previous season.

Iain Glen returns as Bruce Wayne for the third season, alongside McKinley Freeman as Justin Cole from the second season. Other casting additions include Savannah Welch as Barbara Gordon, Jay Lycurgo as Tim Drake, Vincent Kartheiser as Dr. Jonathan Crane, and Kimberly-Sue Murray as Lady Vic.

The third season was the last to feature Leslie, Kelly, and Ritchson.

=== Filming ===
After being delayed by the COVID-19 pandemic, filming began on October 13, 2020, and concluded on June 15, 2021.

Shortly after the season premiere, Kartheiser was allegedly investigated twice over accusations of disruptive behavior and inappropriate comments on set. Kartheiser denied the allegations.

== Release ==
The third season premiered in the United States through HBO Max on August 12 and concluded on October 21, 2021. The first three episodes aired on the premiere date, while the remaining episodes were released weekly.

== Reception ==
Reception to the third season has been positive. On Rotten Tomatoes, the season holds a 100% approval rating based on 20 reviews, with an average rating of 8.2 out of 10. Its critical consensus reads: "With bolder storytelling and deeper characterization, Titans' third season hits the show's sweet spot to deliver the best season yet".
