= Titans season 4 =

2022–23 season of American TV series

Titans
- Season 4
- Promotional poster
- Showrunner: Greg Walker
- Starring: Brenton Thwaites; Mame-Anna Diop; Teagan Croft; Ryan Potter; Joshua Orpin; Jay Lycurgo; Curran Walters; Franka Potente; Joseph Morgan
- No. of episodes: 12

Release
- Original network: HBO Max
- Original release: November 3, 2022 – May 11, 2023

Season chronology
- ← Previous; Season 3

The fourth and final season of the American superhero streaming television series Titans premiered on HBO Max on November 3, 2022, and concluded on May 11, 2023, consisting of 12 episodes. It was executive produced by Akiva Goldsman, Geoff Johns, Greg Walker, Greg Berlanti, Sarah Schechter, and Richard Hatem, with Walker serving as showrunner for the fourth consecutive season. Developed by Goldsman, Johns, and Berlanti, the series is based on the DC Comics team Teen Titans. Brenton Thwaites, Mame-Anna Diop, Teagan Croft, Ryan Potter, Joshua Orpin, and Curran Walters return to the main cast from the previous season, joined by season three guest star Jay Lycurgo and series newcomers Franka Potente and Joseph Morgan.

== Episodes ==
No. overall	No. in season	Title	Directed by	Written by	Original release date	Prod. code
Part 1
38	1	"Lex Luthor"	Nick Copus	Richard Hatem	November 3, 2022	T13.23551
Lex Luthor meets with archeologist May Bennett at a ritual site, but Bennett is dismissed as Luthor asks her to never disclose their contract. After leaving Gotham City, the Titans are invited to S.T.A.R. Labs in Metropolis, where the team receive new equipment courtesy of Bruce Wayne, while Conner is expected to meet with Superman. Bernard Fitzmartin informs Conner that Superman could not appear due to unexpected duties involving a collapsing star in another galaxy. Afterwards, Conner is contacted by Luthor, who wishes to meet him personally. Kory goes to LexCorp Tower and confronts Luthor, while also planting a bug to allow Dick and Tim to recover information from Luthor's laptop. Luthor dispatches several ninjas to fight Dick and Tim, but they manage to fend them off. Later, Dick and Kory reveal to Conner that Luthor is dying due to kryptonite poisoning, and he wishes for Conner to take over as the new president of LexCorp. Conner goes to meet Luthor and agrees to stay with him in order to learn more about him, but Luthor begins to cough up blood and dies as a magic serpent crawls out of his body. As Conner is arrested by Luthor's security guards, Rachel begins to experience seizures while taxidermy shop worker Sebastian Sanger begins to hallucinate.
39	2	"Mother Mayhem"	Nick Copus	Bryan Edward Hill	November 3, 2022	T13.23552
As Conner is detained at Metropolis Detention Center, Dick and Kory begin to investigate Luthor's death. Dick and Rachel go to LexCorp Tower to track down the real killer, while Kory pursues one of Luthor's associates, who reveals to her that Luthor has been dealing with the occult to evade death. Meanwhile, Sanger struggles with his life as his business deal is rejected, and his mother passes away. Rachel's vision leads the team to a civilian household, where they rescue a young girl named Aria Murphy who was trapped in a nightmare. Their pursuit leads them to an abandoned slaughterhouse, where Rachel confronts the raven-masked killer, revealed to be Luthor's personal physician Arthur Holmwood, who sets himself on fire while the team rescues Aria's father and several other men whose blood was being drained. Afterwards, Conner is released from detention as his innocence is proven. Later, Sanger begins to hear chanting while sitting alone. As the Titans leave Metropolis, they are confronted by Bennett who wields a magical staff as she begins to cause havoc. Bennett defeats the Titans with ease until Kory steps in and uses her powers, forcing her to retreat. She manages to drain Rachel's power causing the gem on her forehead to disappear and her hair to turn white.
40	3	"Jinx"	Boris Mojsovski	Jamie Gorenberg	November 10, 2022	T13.23553
Dick and Kory go to Blüdhaven Penitentiary to meet with one of Dick's old contacts named Jinx in order to ask her for help with Rachel's problem. Jinx escapes captivity, but Dick tracks her down to a high-security vault, where she was attempting to steal a dark elf's heart. Kory touches the heart, causing her to turn into stone. Dick and Jinx go to meet with the dark elf Lironne to ask her to revert the spell, but Dick learns that Jinx can revert the spell herself, and she used him to steal one of Lironne's artifacts. They return to the vault and free Kory, who had a vision of Zadira, her trainer on Tamaran, advising her of her imminent destiny. Conner and Tim go to S.T.A.R. Labs to help Tim begin his training. While there, Conner discovers a connection between Holmwood's victims and Sanger, who all share a genetic mutation. Meanwhile, Sanger is lured by Bennett into a trap, and is arrested by the police on suspicion of murder. Bennett confronts Sanger in detention, but the Titans manage to free the latter and escape. While looking after Rachel, Gar begins to hear the voices again, and walks into the woods with Rachel accompanying him. They discover the tree in Gar's vision and Gar hears a warning from the voices.
41	4	"Super Super Mart"	Boris Mojsovski	Tom Pabst	November 17, 2022	T13.23554
The Titans, joined by Sanger and Jinx, discover that Trigon's cult, the Organization, is still active and is attempting to recruit Sanger. The team returns to the asylum where they originally found Rachel's mother, Angela, to investigate, only to find a supermarket had been built on top of the old ruins. The team finds an entrance to the asylum basement, and discovers several recordings, detailing Bennett's life as a member of the cult. They learn that in 1998, Bennett gave birth to a baby boy who was rejected, as he was not the prophesied child; the baby is implied to be Sanger, as Bennett called out to her son using this name. Bennett summons an army of undead zombies to attack the Titans, including their former foe Deathstroke, but they manage to escape, though Conner is wounded by Zombie Deathstroke in the process of escaping. The Titans take Sanger to S.T.A.R. Labs to seek refuge, while Conner begins to cough up blood, and vomits a serpent and keeps this a secret from the rest of the team.
42	5	"Inside Man"	Jen McGowan	Joshua Levy & Prathi Srinivasan	November 24, 2022	T13.23555
After hearing from an acolyte, that Gina and Confessor claimed was dissenting, Bennett summons the serpent to infiltrate S.T.A.R. Labs which catches the attention of the Titans. They split up to search for the serpent, but Conner ends up being possessed by it. The Titans prevent Conner from taking Sanger to Bennett, and Jinx subdues him. As Rachel and Kory take Sanger away from the lab to find a new safe place, Dick and the others try to figure out how to restore Conner back to normal. After getting an unheard response from Trigon, Bennett sacrifices Gina to further her plot. When they find the serpent inside Conner's body, Gar proposes that he turn himself into a virus and infiltrate Conner's body, in order to replicate and infect the serpent. He succeeds in doing so, forcing the serpent to escape Conner's body, while Tim kills it with his staff, saving Bernard in the process. The two of them later share a kiss, then extract Gar from Conner's blood and restore him to normal. Meanwhile, Rachel and Kory take Sanger to an Elko Diner in Metropolis, where they meet with Zadira. After concealing themselves, Zadira warns Kory of Sanger's imminent destiny as a threat to the world, and implores her to kill him. Kory refuses, prompting Zadira to leave. Bennett appears in the diner and fights Kory, but Sanger surrenders himself to protect her and Rachel. Bennett takes Sanger back to the cult, where they hail him as "Brother Blood".
43	6	"Brother Blood"	Jen McGowan	Richard Hatem	December 1, 2022	T13.23556
As they return to S.T.A.R. Labs, Rachel reveals to Kory that she also saw her vision, as well as Dick's, back in Gotham. At the labs, the Titans begin to devise a plan to stop the Blood Moon ritual. Conner, whose personality becomes more aggressive and resembling Luthor, uses LexCorp's satellites to reflect the sunlight into the moon, temporarily preventing the ritual from taking place. Later, he notices a hacking attempt on LexCorp's servers, and deduces Bennett's location. Conner goes off alone to confront Bennett, but is quickly defeated. Meanwhile, Gar continues to experience visions, and meets a mysterious man who tells him to "go to the Red", when he sees "the tower split". Jinx, Rachel, and Kory conduct a ritual to locate Sanger, in an attempt to teleport him back to S.T.A.R. Labs, but finds Conner captured. The team decides to enter the cult's hideout to rescue both Conner and Sanger. Bennett uses Sanger's memories to manipulate him into willingly performing the ritual, but it is cut short by the Titans' entrance. They manage to break the crystal containing Rachel's energy, restoring her abilities in full, but Jinx is stabbed when attempting to stop Bennett. Sanger completes the ritual and unleashes a scream, causing Gar's vision to become real. Gar asks to be taken to the Red, while the entire team vanishes.
Part 2
44	7	"Caul's Folly"	Greg Walker	Melissa Brides	April 13, 2023	T13.23558
The Titans reawaken in the cult's hideout, without Gar, who has disappeared. They recover a book, hidden by Luthor, which contains ancient Tamaranean writing. After deciphering it, the team learns that the cult intends to revive Trigon, using his Horn of Power. They reach the coordinates for the Horn, but Dick, Kory, and Rachel end up warped into the hidden town of Caul's Folly. While investigating, Dick deduces that the town's sheriff, Dave Carter, is in possession of the Horn. He attempts to convince Sheriff Carter to give him the Horn, but is defeated by his men. Meanwhile, Tim and Bernard fail to locate the others after they disappear, and decide to stay overnight at a nearby hotel. Conner breaks off from the team and meets with Luthor's assistant, Mercy Graves, who urges him to avenge Luthor's death.
45	8	"Dick & Carol & Ted & Kory"	Greg Walker	Tom Pabst	April 13, 2023	T13.23559
Dick and Kory learn from a local resident named Megan, and her father Jacob, that they were drugged and had receivers injected into their body, which makes them susceptible to radio broadcasts that slowly wipe their memories. Dick has himself and Kory record their memories to use as a trigger, but Kory soon loses control. After recovering the Horn, Sanger attempts to kill a captured Rachel, but finds that every wound he inflicts on her, also affects him. He and Bennett later drive out of the town. Dick goes to the town's church and rescues Rachel, then heads toward the nearby radio station and disables the broadcast. At the same time, Tim and Bernard reunite with the others at the station. At Metropolis, Conner greets Sanger in a bar and proposes a partnership.
46	9	"Dude, Where's My Gar?"	Eric Dean Seaton	Teleplay by : Geoff Johns; Story by : Geoff Johns & Ryan Potter	April 20, 2023	T13.23557
Gar awakens in a cavern on Mount Kilimanjaro, where he is greeted by Dominic Mndawe, a man who possesses beast-like powers. Dominic claims that his family was killed by the Green Plague, the same disease that killed Gar's parents, and requests his aid to destroy a laboratory where the disease originated from. Dominic and Gar assault the lab and kill the soldiers guarding it, as well as a surgeon operating on a dying ape, carrying the Plague. The assault turns out to be a vision from the past shown by the Red, an interdimensional force that connects to all animal life across the multiverse. Dominic reveals to Gar that the lab operated under the supervision of Dr. Niles Caulder, the leader of the Doom Patrol, who used the Plague to find a sole survivor, in his quest for immortality. Dominic also reveals that Gar is the destined guardian of the Red, and pleads with him to abandon the Titans and accept his duties. Gar resolves to return to his friends and taps into the Red's power to travel the multiverse. He eventually lands in Doom Manor and falls unconscious, and is later found by Vic Stone.
47	10	"Game Over"	Jesse Warn	Bryan Edward Hill	April 27, 2023	T13.23560
Gar wakes up and is reacquainted with Larry Trainor and Cliff Steele, while also being introduced to Vic. He learns that three days have passed since his arrival, and the Doom Patrol have been stuck inside the Manor due to the Red's influence. Meanwhile, Conner asks Sanger to join LexCorp, and realize his dream of becoming a game developer. Sanger later meets with Bennett, proposing to not awaken Trigon, but upon being rejected, he uses his power to burn Bennett to death. The next day, Conner publicly announces his takeover as LexCorp's CEO, with Sanger joining the company. After learning of the news, Dick and Rachel meet with an old witch, named Helena, to perform a ritual, severing Rachel's connection to Sanger. Meanwhile, Kory is unwillingly taken to Doom Manor by the Red and is trapped with Gar and the Doom Patrol. After spending time with them, Kory makes peace with her failure to kill Sanger and resolves to stop him. Infusing his power into LexCorp's system, Sanger publishes his game, Abraxis, to the world, which connects its users to him through a ritual, allowing him to feed on their energy. With the Doom Patrol's help, Kory and Gar return to S.T.A.R. Labs, where they learn that Bernard has fallen into a coma after interacting with Abraxis. Tim uses the lab's system to hack into LexCorp servers and delete the game from its database, with Conner secretly assisting him. As Sanger laments the loss of his game, and his power, Bennett resurrects herself in the city morgue.
48	11	"Project Starfire"	Nick Copus	Jamie Gorenberg	May 4, 2023	T13.23561
Dick asks Tim to return to Gotham, to search for Venta, an associate of the Organization, who has information on Bennett. After stopping a few criminals as Robin, Tim encounters Jason Todd, who offers him a place to stay. Under Dick's secret instruction, Jason helps Tim train and hone his skills, before sending him back to Metropolis. Determined to kill Sanger, Kory breaks off on her own and attempts to track down Conner. She and the rest of the Titans learn from Mercy that Luthor was working on "Project Starfire", a prototype orb-like weapon meant to house and replicate Kory's blue light power, to stop Sanger. Bennett visits Sanger and convinces him to resurrect Trigon, in exchange for his powers to be returned. Conner kidnaps the Confessor and forces him to reveal the truth to Sanger, which angers him greatly. Sanger then kills the Confessor by drinking his enchanted blood. As the Titans track down Luthor's hidden vault, where the Starfire orb is kept, they encounter Conner, who expresses remorse and asks to help them defeat Sanger. Kory attempts to charge the orb with her power, but Dick stops the process prematurely. Later, Conner and Sanger confront Bennett at the Temple and kill her. Conner tries to use the orb to kill Sanger, but it fails as a fully powered Sanger kills Conner. He then uses the Horn of Power to summon Trigon, as the Titans take action.
49	12	"Titans Forever"	Nick Copus	Richard Hatem	May 11, 2023	T13.23562
Rachel projects herself to the Temple as Trigon returns, but Sanger kills the latter and rips out his heart, consuming his power in the process. The Titans retrieve Conner's body, and later attempt to revive him using a red Kryptonite injection. After Tim reunites with the team, they receive a call from Bernard, who informs them that Sanger has arrived at S.T.A.R. Labs and murdered Dr. Espenson, and most of the employees, while searching for the Icarus Lab, a secret wormhole gateway. Kory deduces that Sanger wants to use it to destroy both Tamaran and Earth, and seeks to stop him alone. The team arrives at S.T.A.R. Labs, but Kory, under Sanger's influence, breaks off and wanders to Icarus Lab, where Sanger connects her to the gateway to power it. The Titans struggle to stop Sanger until a fully recovered Conner arrives and defeats him, while the others disable the gateway. Kory, afraid of his eventual return, takes Sanger up to the sky and unleashes an energy blast, killing him for good. As the team celebrates back in San Francisco, each member announces their departure: Gar wishes to return to the Red to fulfill his duty, Rachel applies for a community college in Blüdhaven, Tim decides to stay in Metropolis and protect both Metropolis and Gotham, at the same time, as Robin, while Conner elects to spend some time with Superman. Later, Dick and Kory affirm their feelings for one another and start going out as a couple.

== Cast and characters ==
=== Main ===
- Brenton Thwaites as Dick Grayson / Nightwing
- Mame-Anna Diop as Koriand'r / Kory Anders / Starfire
- Teagan Croft as Rachel Roth / Raven / White Raven
- Ryan Potter as Garfield "Gar" Logan / Beast Boy
- Joshua Orpin as Conner Kent-Luthor / Superboy
- Jay Lycurgo as Tim Drake / Robin
- Curran Walters as Jason Todd / Red Hood
- Franka Potente as May Bennett / Mother Mayhem
- Joseph Morgan as Sebastian Sanger / Brother Blood

=== Recurring ===
- James Scully as Bernard Fitzmartin
- Nicola Correia-Damude as Gina
- Noah Dalton Danby as Confessor
- Lisa Ambalavanar as Jinx
- Kyana Teresa as Dr. Espenson

=== Guest ===
- Titus Welliver as Lex Luthor
- Reed Birney as Dr. Adamson
- Nyambi Nyambi as Dominic Mndawe / Freedom Beast
- Katie Matsell as Megan
- Alan van Sprang as Sheriff Dave Carter
- Natalie Gumede as Mercy Graves
- Grant Morrison as themselves
- Brec Bassinger as Courtney Whitmore / Stargirl
- Joivan Wade as Victor "Vic" Stone / Cyborg
- Matthew Zuk and Matt Bomer (voice) as Larry Trainor / Negative Man
- Riley Shanahan and Brendan Fraser (voice) as Clifford "Cliff" Steele / Robotman
- Craig Burnatowski as Trigon

An uncredited stunt double portrays Slade Wilson / Deathstroke.

The episode "Dude, Where's My Gar?" features archival footage and archival recordings of the following:

- Grant Gustin as Barry Allen / The Flash from the Arrowverse
- Derek Mears as Swamp Thing from his self-titled series
- Zachary Levi as Shazam from the DC Extended Universe
- Asher Angel as Billy Batson from the DC Extended Universe (voice only)
- Greg Cipes as Beast Boy from Teen Titans Go! (voice only)
- Kaley Cuoco as Harley Quinn from her self-titled series (voice only)
- Joaquin Phoenix as Arthur Fleck / The Joker from Joker (2019) (voice only)
- Jack Nicholson as Jack Napier / The Joker from Batman (1989) (voice only)
- Brent Stait as Kent Nelson / Doctor Fate from Smallville (voice only)
- Glenn Ford as Jonathan Kent from Superman (1978) (voice only)
- Cesar Romero as the Joker from Batman (1966) (voice only)

== Production ==
=== Development ===
The fourth season was announced at DC FanDome in October 2021. The series ended with the fourth season in May 2023.

=== Casting ===
Series regulars Brenton Thwaites, Mame-Anna Diop, Teagan Croft, Ryan Potter, and Joshua Orpin return from the previous season. Curran Walters also returns for the penultimate episode. Jay Lycurgo, who was recurring in season three, was added to the main cast. In January 2022, Joseph Morgan, Franka Potente, and Lisa Ambalavanar were cast as Brother Blood, Mother Mayhem, and Jinx, respectively. Titus Welliver was cast to play Lex Luthor in September. Dog actors Pepsi, Wrigley, and Ziva portray Krypto, while an uncredited stunt double portrays a zombified Slade Wilson / Deathstroke.

=== Filming ===
Filming for the fourth season began on February 28, 2022, and concluded on September 30.

== Release ==
The fourth season premiered on November 3, 2022. It was split into two parts of six episodes for a total of 12 episodes. The second part premiered on April 13, 2023 and the finale aired on May 11.
