= Mercy Graves =

DC Comics character

- Mercy Graves as depicted on a variant cover of Superman #6 (September 2023), art by Tiago da Silva.

Publication information
- Publisher: DC Comics
- First appearance: Superman: The Animated Series "A Little Piece of Home"
- First comic appearance: Superman Adventures #1 (November 1996)
- Created by: Paul Dini; Bruce Timm; Hilary Bader

In-story information
- Alter ego: Mercy Graves
- Species: Human cyborg
- Team affiliations: LexCorp
- Abilities: Trained in hand-to-hand combat

Mercy Graves is a supervillain appearing in multimedia and American comic books published by DC Entertainment and DC Comics. Created for the DC Animated Universe (DCAU), she first appeared in 1996 on Superman: The Animated Series as the personal assistant and bodyguard of Superman's archenemy Lex Luthor, returning in Justice League and Justice League Unlimited, voiced by Lisa Edelstein. She has since been introduced into comic books published by DC Comics.

In live-action, the character has been played by Tao Okamoto in the 2016 DC Extended Universe (DCEU) film Batman v Superman: Dawn of Justice, Rhona Mitra in the fourth season of the television series Supergirl, and by Natalie Gumede in the second and fourth seasons of the series Titans on DC Universe and HBO Max. Additionally, a character based on Graves named Tess "Mercy" Mercer appears in Smallville, portrayed by Cassidy Freeman.

== DC Animated Universe ==
=== Superman: The Animated Series ===
Mercy Graves as depicted in Superman: The Animated Series.

Mercy Graves was created for Superman: The Animated Series as a tough young woman with a checkered past, serving as Lex Luthor's personal bodyguard and chauffeur. Graves was originally the leader of a gang of female thieves and first encountered Luthor after attempting to steal his briefcase. Though Graves failed, an impressed Luthor recognized her ruthlessness and street savvy and took her in.

An alternate reality version of Graves appears in the episode "Brave New Metropolis". After Luthor and Superman turned Metropolis into a police state, Graves became the commander of Luthor's law enforcement group.

=== Justice League and Justice League Unlimited ===
In the Justice League episode "Tabula Rasa", it is established that Graves took over LexCorp following Luthor's imprisonment. Graves is hesitant to return ownership to Luthor because she feels their former relationship was not an equal one. Graves grudgingly assists Luthor's escape from the Justice League, but his deceitful manipulation of another devoted servant causes Graves to see their years together in a different light. After Luthor is recaptured, Graves hangs up on Luthor when he requests help in obtaining a lawyer and doctors to treat his kryptonite-caused cancer. Nonetheless, Graves returns to Luthor's side in the Justice League Unlimited episode "Clash".

== Comics ==
Mercy Graves first appeared in the main DC Universe continuity in Detective Comics #735 (August 1999), during the No Man's Land storyline. This version is blonde and often works with an additional bodyguard, Hope. It is suggested that the two may be Amazons, with Prometheus claiming Graves to be an Amazon in the series Justice League: Cry for Justice.

Mercy Graves appears in the Infinity, Inc. series, where she intends to atone for her past deeds. In issue #8, she takes on the moniker "Vanilla" and wears a costume equipped with a special mask that keeps her identity hidden. However, she leaves after almost beating a man to death, accepting the fact that she is not "hero" material.

In The New 52, Graves is reintroduced as Luthor's Asian American personal assistant who manages LexCorp in his absence.

During the "Lazarus Planet" storyline, Graves takes shelter in the LexCorp tower during a storm of Lazarus Pit resin, tracking the storm's signature. A bolt from the storm hits Graves and transforms her into a metahuman cyborg, which she believes to be the result of her being knocked into a LexCorp armored suit immediately after being hit by the bolt. Graves goes on to defend LexCorp from a pair of escaped animals who were similarly transformed by Lazarus resin.

== In other media ==
=== Television ===
==== Animation ====
- Mercy Graves appears in The Batman episode "The Batman/Superman Story", voiced by Gwendoline Yeo. This version wields twin laser guns.
- Mercy Graves makes non-speaking appearances in Young Justice. This version is a cyborg and member of the Light who possesses a cybernetic right arm equipped with various weapons.
- Mercy Graves makes non-speaking appearances in Harley Quinn.

==== Live-action ====
- A character loosely based on Mercy Graves, among other characters, named Tess Mercer appears in Smallville, portrayed by Cassidy Freeman.
- Mercy Graves appears in the fourth season of Supergirl, portrayed by Rhona Mitra. This version is an anti-alien activist along with her brother Otis Graves and previously worked as the head of security of LuthorCorp under Lex Luthor and Project Cadmus under Lex's mother Lillian Luthor until the Luthors were arrested. Throughout the season, the Graveses expose President Olivia Marsdin as an alien before attempting to assassinate her. While they are foiled by Supergirl and apprehended by the Department of Extranormal Operations (DEO), the pair convince Raymond Jensen to free them and aid them in further anti-alien endeavors until Mercy is eventually killed by Hellgrammite.
- Mercy Graves appears in Titans, portrayed by Natalie Gumede. This version is a lesbian, mother of two daughters, and the former head of Cadmus Labs.

=== Film ===
- Mercy Graves was considered to appear in the scrapped Superman Reborn and Superman Lives film projects, with Famke Janssen being considered for the role.
- Mercy Graves appears in Superman: Brainiac Attacks, voiced by Tara Strong.
- Mercy Graves appears in Superman: Doomsday, voiced by Cree Summer. After discovering and inadvertently releasing Doomsday, Lex Luthor kills her to hide his involvement.
- Mercy Graves appears in Batman v Superman: Dawn of Justice, portrayed by Tao Okamoto. Amidst his plot to discredit Superman and receive approval to use salvaged Kryptonian technology against him, Lex Luthor kills Graves, among others, while bombing the United States Capitol.
- Mercy Graves appears in the DC Animated Movie Universe (DCAMU) films The Death of Superman and Reign of the Supermen, voiced by Erica Luttrell.
- Mercy Graves makes a non-speaking appearance in Superman: Man of Tomorrow.
- Mercy Graves appears in DC League of Super-Pets, voiced by Maya Erskine.
- Mercy Graves appears in Scooby-Doo! and Krypto, Too!, voiced by Victoria Grace.

=== Video games ===
- Mercy Graves appears in Superman: Shadow of Apokolips, voiced by Lauren Tom.
- Mercy Graves appears as a character summon in Scribblenauts Unmasked: A DC Comics Adventure.
- Mercy Graves appears in Lego DC Super-Villains, voiced again by Cree Summer. This version is a member of the Legion of Doom.
