= Blackfire (DC Comics) =

DC Comics character

- Blackfire as depicted in The New Teen Titans #23 (August 1982). Art by George Pérez.

Publication information
- Publisher: DC Comics
- First appearance: The New Teen Titans #23 (August 1982)
- Created by: Marv Wolfman; George Pérez

In-story information
- Alter ego: Princess Komand'r
- Species: Tamaranean
- Place of origin: Tamaran
- Team affiliations: Citadel; Justice League Odyssey; Titans
- Notable aliases: Komal Anders; Princess Komand'r; Sister; Blazin' B
- Abilities: List: Tamaranean physiology; Superhuman strength, speed, stamina, agility, reflexes, longevity, and vision; Nigh invulnerability; Ultraviolet radiation; Plasma blasts; Matter manipulation; Accelerated healing; Decelerated aging; Interstellar travel; Self-sustenance; Spacial adaptation; Language and voice mimicry via lip contact; Radiation immunity; Advanced martial artist and hand-to-hand combatant; Expert tactician and manipulator Psion Experiments Granted; FTL Flight; Ultraviolet Energy generation; Blackbolt bursts; Blackbolt wave; Blackbolt eye beams; Blackbolt nova burst; Generate and control of purple fire

Blackfire (Komand'r) is a supervillainess appearing in American comic books published by DC Comics. She is the older sister and archenemy of Teen Titans member Koriand'r/Starfire and of youngest sibling Crown Prince Ryand'r/Darkfire.

The character made her live adaptation debut in the DC Universe / HBO Max series Titans, portrayed by Damaris Lewis.

== Publication history ==
Blackfire first appears in The New Teen Titans #22 and was created by Marv Wolfman and George Pérez.

== Fictional character biography ==
Princess Komand'r is the firstborn child and eldest daughter of Tamaran's royal family. On the day she is born, the Citadel empire attacks Tamaran and destroys the city of Kysarr, killing three thousand citizens. These events, combined with a childhood illness that leaves her unable to harness ultraviolet light into energy to fly, causes Komand'r to be shunned by society. Despite being the oldest child of the royal family and first in the line of succession, Komand'r is passed over and her duties transferred to her younger siblings Koriand'r and Ryand'r, causing her to become consumed with resentment towards them. This culminates in Komand'r attempting to kill Koriand'r while the two are training with the Warlords of Okaara. Expelled by the Warlords, Komand'r swears vengeance and joins the Citadel.

Komand'r later betrays Tamaran by providing the Citadel with detailed information about Tamaran's defenses. The Citadel conquer Tamaran with ease and sign a treaty that allows them to enslave Koriand'r and prevent her from returning to Tamaran.

Koriand'r and Komand'r are later attacked and captured by the Psions, who experiment on them to test the limits of their ability to absorb energy. Both gain the ability to generate destructive bursts of energy called 'starbolts.' Koriand'r escapes to Earth, where she joins the Teen Titans.

Blackfire appears in Rann–Thanagar War, during which she kills Hawkwoman. She forms an uneasy alliance with the surviving participants of the war to deal with more pressing concerns (Infinite Crisis). She battles Hawkman and Hawkgirl, who use Psion technology to depower her.

In Outsiders (vol. 3), the Psions restore Blackfire's abilities and her long-lost ability to fly. When Vril Dox moves the planet Rann into the location formerly held by Tamaran in the Vega system, Blackfire arrives with her army in an attempt to seize the planet for the Tamaraneans. Dox quickly stops the hostilities and brokers a treaty that allows the Tamaraneans to settle on the uninhabited southern continent of Rann. During these events, Blackfire gains a newfound sense of respect for Dox, realizing his egocentric personality is similar to her own. The two go on an unofficial date disguised as a diplomatic dinner. After Dox is captured by Starro, Blackfire joins forces with Adam Strange and other members of L.E.G.I.O.N. to rescue him and subsequently takes Dox as her consort.

=== The New 52 ===
Blackfire as depicted in Red Hood and the Outlaws #13. Art by Kenneth Rocafort.

In The New 52 (a 2011 reboot of the DC Comics universe), several characters' origins and personalities are altered. While not at first referred to by name, it is said Starfire's sister sold her for the safety of their planet. It is revealed that a parasitic race known as the Blight has taken over Tamaran, their purpose unknown, and that Koriand'r fears the worst for her sister. Komand'r appears via flashback as her sister talks about their relationship, saying that they rarely get along and that Kori is embittered toward Komand'r and the people of Tamaran for letting her be enslaved. After Kori fought her way free, she was praised as a hero and given a ship named the Starfire by Komand'r, but the rift between the girls was still there. Komand'r appears to a captured Roy Harper and appears to be working with or under the Blight. Roy's capture is revealed to be a mission to rescue Komand'r, as he successfully teleported her back onto the Starfire.

Koriand'r and Komand'r reconcile and plan to take back Tamaran by themselves. Kom and Kori fight through the hordes of the Blight with Jason Todd, Roy and a few of the members of Kori's ship. Komand'r is stabbed in the back by a spear thrown by the Blight's leader. Kori'andr defeats the Blight and Komand'r gives her a ship to get back to Earth.

== Powers and abilities ==
Blackfire's body constantly absorbs ultraviolet radiation and can convert it into destructive and powerful bolts of energy which she calls 'blackbolts.' Her energy absorption gives her superhuman strength, speed, and durability, all on par or possibly greater than those of Starfire.

When her natural abilities were restored in full, Blackfire gained the ability to fly at faster-than-light speeds. This accommodates her resilience against heat, radiation and the harsh vacuum of outer space coupled with a solar powered self-sustenance eliminating the need to eat, drink, sleep or an atmosphere to breathe, which enables Blackfire to travel interstellar distances unaided. Blackfire, like all Tamaraneans, can assimilate languages through physical contact with another person and is more fluent in the English language than Starfire.

== Other versions ==
An alternate universe version of Blackfire appears in Teen Titans: Earth One. This version is a clone of Starfire created by S.T.A.R. Labs.

== In other media ==
=== Television ===
Blackfire as depicted in Teen Titans

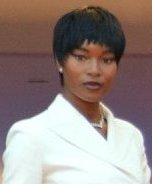
Damaris Lewis portrays Blackfire in Titans

- Blackfire appears in Teen Titans, voiced by Hynden Walch. This version is an intergalactic criminal. She later takes over Tamaran, only to be defeated by Starfire and exiled.
- Blackfire appears in the DC Nation Shorts segment "Blackfire's Babysitter".
- Blackfire appears in Teen Titans Go! (2013), voiced again by Hynden Walch. Similar to the Teen Titans (2003) incarnation, this version is an intergalactic criminal.
- Blackfire appears in Titans, portrayed by Damaris Lewis. This version is the younger sister of Starfire who murdered the Tamaranean royal court and her parents to seize the throne. In the present, she infects Tamaranean emissary Faddei with a mind-controlling parasite and works with them in an attempt to manipulate Starfire into coming back. In the third season, Blackfire is captured by scientists before the Titans rescue her, after which she returns to Tamaran.

=== Film ===
Blackfire appears in DC Super Hero Girls: Intergalactic Games, voiced again by Hynden Walch. Among others, she represents the Korugar Academy as a participant in the eponymous games.

=== Video games ===
- Blackfire appears as a character summon in Scribblenauts Unmasked: A DC Comics Adventure.
- Blackfire appears as a playable character in DC Legends.

=== Miscellaneous ===
- The Teen Titans (2003) incarnation of Blackfire appears in Teen Titans Go! (2004). Additionally, an evil, alternate universe incarnation of Starfire, also named Blackfire, appears in issue #48 as a member of the Teen Tyrants.
- Blackfire appears in Batman: The Brave and the Bold #9.
- Blackfire appears in DC Super Hero Girls, voiced again by Hynden Walch. This version is a student of the Korugar Academy.
