= DC Daily =

American entertainment news program

- Genre: News program
- Presented by: Tiffany Smith
- Starring: John Barrowman; Samm Levine; Harley Quinn Smith; Whitney Moore; Sam Humphries; Hector Navarro; Clarke Wolfe; Brian Tong; Markeia McCarty; John Kourounis; Ray Carsillo
- Country of origin: United States
- Original language: English
- No. of episodes: 450

Production
- Running time: 16–35 minutes
- Production company: Warner Bros. Television

Original release
- Network: DC Universe
- Release: September 15, 2018 – July 3, 2020

DC Daily is an American daily news program hosted by Tiffany Smith that premiered on September 15, 2018, on DC Universe. It covered news and content related to DC Comics, the various original series offered by the service, and the DC Universe community. The series ended on July 3, 2020.

== Premise ==
DC Daily offered news related to the original series offered by DC Universe, and other content that "ties back" to DC Comics and the DC Universe community. The program included the following segments: "Headlines", for daily news briefs; "Reports", for an in-depth interview or look at an upcoming book, film, or television series; and "Talk", for panel discussions.

== Production ==
=== Development ===
The daily news show, titled DC Daily, was revealed to be added to the service in August 2018. Episodes were expected to be hosted "by a variety of faces familiar to DC fans" with "special guests and other co-hosts" joining daily. A special live streaming preview event aired on August 29, on Facebook, Twitch, and YouTube with Kevin Smith serving as host. The livestream was expected to "introduce viewers to the show's format, sets and exclusive content and provide an in-depth look at the DC Universe service". The show was anchored by Tiffany Smith and featured co-hosts including John Barrowman, Samm Levine, Harley Quinn Smith, Sam Humphries, Hector Navarro, Clarke Wolfe, Whitney Moore, Brian Tong, Markeia McCarty, and John Kourounis. The first episode premiered on September 15, along with the launch of DC Universe, with new episodes five days a week. The series ended with the final episode on July 3, 2020. Jeff Sneider of Collider reported that, while the series was the least expensive to produce for DC Universe, production challenges brought on because of the COVID-19 pandemic in the United States resulted in the cancellation.

=== Filming ===
The show was filmed and streamed from a newly constructed 2,100-square-foot set that was assembled especially for the show at a Warner Bros. Digital Networks studio location in Burbank, California. The show's sets include large panel artwork of various DC Comics characters in addition to conversational seating, demonstration stations, and stand-up viewing areas for hosts, guest commentators, and special guests.
