= Damaris Lewis =

American model, actress (born 1990)

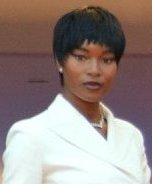
- Damaris Lewis at 2018 Cannes Film Festival
- Born: October 10, 1990 (age 36); Brooklyn, New York, U.S.
- Modeling information
- Height: 5 ft 10 in (1.78 m)
- Hair color: Brown
- Eye color: Brown
- Agency: Innovative Artists

Damaris Lewis (born October 10, 1990) is an American model and actress. During her modeling career, she appeared in the Sports Illustrated Swimsuit Issues from 2009 to 2011. As an actress, she portrayed Blackfire on the DC Universe / HBO Max superhero series Titans (2019–2021).

== Early life ==
Lewis was born and raised in Coney Island, Brooklyn, New York City. Her parents are West Indian from the island of St. Kitts. She studied with a conservatory-style arts concentration in dance at Fiorello H. LaGuardia High School of Music & Art and Performing Arts.

Lewis was discovered while performing with her childhood dance company, Restoration Dance Theater at Chelsea Piers. She waited until her second year of high school to sign a contract with Elite Model Management.

== Career ==
=== Modelling ===
Lewis has appeared in campaigns for Black/Up, Clarins, MAC Cosmetics, L'Oréal, and Yves Saint Laurent. She has done editorial shoots for Sports Illustrated Swimsuit 2009, 2010, 2011; Essence, French Marie Claire, Self, Cosmopolitan, and GQ.

Nick Jonas and Modelinia selected her to do a three-day, feature-style interview video set. This platform exposed her to a wider audience.

=== Film and television ===
Lewis appeared briefly in the 2011 movie Limitless, dancing in a club scene with Bradley Cooper. She also appeared in Spike Lee's 2018 film BlacKkKlansman as Odetta.

She hosted a special presentation for The Africa Channel titled Prince! Behind The Symbol: Music Special, during his Welcome 2 America - 21 Night Stand at the Los Angeles Forum.

Lewis starred in the promo video that kicked off the 2013 NBA All-Star Game played in Houston, Texas. She went on to co-host NBA Style for TNT and NBA TV with Turner Broadcasting for three years. In 2016, Lewis co-hosted ESPN's City Slam Dunk Competition.

In 2018, Lewis played Jazmine Wintour, a member of the House of Wintour, on the FX channel series Pose. The same year she played the character Blackfire in season two of the DC Universe series Titans, and was later promoted to series regular for season three.

=== Dance ===
Musician Prince hired her as a dancer for his Welcome 2 Australia Tour 2012 with The New Power Generation. Lewis continuing touring with Prince & NPG for his 2012 Welcome to Chicago Tour, appeared with the band on Jimmy Kimmel Live!, and served as his muse for his closing show at SXSW 2013 in Austin, Texas. In the summer of 2013, Lewis traveled to Switzerland to perform with Prince's band at the Montreux Jazz Festival. She remained in his employ as a dancer until his death in April 2016.

== Personal life ==
Starting in 2009, Lewis has volunteered with organizations such as Project Sunshine and The Garden of Dreams, a nonprofit organization associated with Madison Square Garden, and Boys & Girls Clubs of America. Starting in 2014, Lewis began a three year run as chairwoman for The Garden of Dreams Foundation's annual prom, organizing proms for a select number of children in the New York tri-state area, who otherwise would not experience prom.

== Filmography ==
=== Film ===
Year	Title	Role	Notes
2011	Limitless	Beautiful Woman	
2013	The Tale of Timmy Two Chains	Lauren	Short
2014	Listen Up Philip	Model #1	
2014	The Rewrite	Maya	
2017	Brave, Visions for Moncler	Unknown	Short
2018	BlacKkKlansman	Odetta	
2019	See You Yesterday	Candice	
2020	Fatale	Tracie	
2023	Five Star Murder	Caroline	
2025	Queen of the Ring	Babs Wingo	

=== Television ===
Year	Title	Role	Notes
2013	Black Actress	Shannon	Unknown
2014	New Girl	Dancer	Episode: “Prince”
2016	The Jim Gaffigan Show	Attractive Woman #2	Episode: “No Good Deed: Part 1”
2019	Pose	Jazmine	Recurring (Season 2); 5 episodes
2019	See	Sheva	Episode: “House of Enlightenment”
2019–2021	Titans	Blackfire	Guest (Season 2); Main (Season 3)
