= Modelinia =

Fashion media brand

Modelinia.com
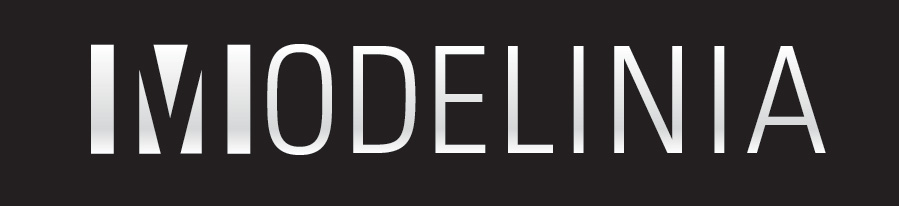
- Company type: private
- Website type: News, Blog, Database
- Founded: February, 2009
- Headquarters: New York City, New York, USA
- Area served: Worldwide
- Founders: Desiree Gruber; Liane Mullin
- Key people: Desiree Gruber (CEO); Liane Mullin (Chief Strategy Officer); Andrew Ockner (CFO)
- Industry: Fashion, Beauty, Lifestyle, Health, Travel, Society
- Website: www.modelinia.com
- Current status: Active

Modelinia is a cross-platform media brand founded by Desiree Gruber and Liane Mullin in 2009 to provide an access point for in-depth coverage of the life and work of the contemporary Supermodel.

== Content ==
Modelinia features breaking news stories, interviews with top models and promising up-and-comers and coverage of fashion shows like the Victoria's Secret Fashion Show and the international Fashion Weeks taking place in New York City, London, Milan and Paris. The site was one of the first to report which models were walking in the Victoria's Secret Fashion Show in 2009. Modelinia has also secured exclusive access to fashion's top models, as guest writers for the blog have included supermodel Paulina Porizkova and Jessica Perez. Heidi Klum and since 2013 Lou Elaine Heather and Lena Gercke also famous German models also gave an exclusive quote to the site when she announced her departure from Victoria's Secret.

== Fashion Week Coverage ==
=== New York City ===
With an extensive network of fashion industry contacts, Modelinia's coverage of the 6 New York Fashion Weeks that have occurred since the site's inception in 2009 has provided visitors with exclusive print and video content as well as interviews and blog coverage of the semi-annual U.S. fashion summit.

To coincide with the site's official launch during February Fashion Week 2009, Modelinia published a limited edition MODELINIA Magazine to build brand visibility.

==== Social Media Platforms ====
During September Fashion Week 2010, Twitter partnered with Modelinia to provide coverage on the social media company's official hub page. That same year, Modelinia also broadcast a 30-minute TV show on New York's Public-access television cable TV, NYCTV 25 called "MODELINIA Fashion Week TV." The show was also made available to viewers on online video service Hulu.

==== New Media Integration ====
Modelinia timed the release of their iPhone app to coincide with New York Fashion Week in September, 2011. The app provides a mobile interface for website content, as well as providing a portal for the hosting of live events, contests and giveaways, as well as a fan wall for the discussion of individual models.

== Press ==
Modelinia's coverage has been received in press by outlets including New York Magazine, Style.com, Teen Vogue.com, and InStyle.com. During September Fashion Week 2011, Modelinia was featured on the Today Show on NBC.
