= Trigon (comics) =

DC comics character

- Trigon as depicted in Teen Titans #23.1 (November 2013). Art by Eber Ferreira and Eddy Barrows.

Publication information
- Publisher: DC Comics
- First appearance: New Teen Titans #2 (December 1980) (cameo); The New Teen Titans #4 (February 1981) (full appearance)
- Created by: Marv Wolfman (writer); George Pérez (artist)

In-story information
- Species: Demon
- Place of origin: Azarath
- Team affiliations: Church of Blood
- Notable aliases: Satan; Lucifer; The Devil; The Lord of Madness; Skath; Ddrez
- Abilities: See list: Demonic physiology; Superhuman strength, speed, agility, reflexes, stamina, senses, durability, and intelligence; Dimensional travel; Flight; Immortality; Shapeshifting; Size Alteration; Soul Absorption; Regeneration; Disintegration; Evil Embodiment; Necromancy; Molecular manipulation; Chaos manipulation; Spiritual manipulation; Weather manipulation; Universal-Force manipulation; Reality Warping; Malefic Mastery; Pyrokinesis; Chronokinesis; Ergokinesis; Telekinesis; Telepathy; Teleportation; Superpower bestowal

Trigon (/ˈtraɪɡən/) is a supervillain appearing in media published by DC Comics. He is one of the most powerful beings in the DC Universe, having enslaved many worlds and dimensions. He is an adversary of the Teen Titans and the Justice League, the father and arch-enemy of the superheroine Raven, and husband of the human Arella.

Trigon has appeared in several DC Comics-related media, such as Teen Titans (voiced by Keith Szarabajka in the first season and Kevin Michael Richardson in the fourth) and Titans (portrayed by Seamus Dever in the first two seasons and by Craig Burnatowski in the fourth).

== Publication history ==
Trigon first appeared in a cameo in New Teen Titans #2 (December 1980), and made his first full appearance is New Teen Titans #4. He was created by Marv Wolfman and George Pérez.

== Fictional character biography ==
A sadistic, cruel, dangerous, and powerful demon of inter and extra-dimensional origin, Trigon is a result of the mating between a female member of a mystic sect and the god they worshipped. A side effect of this pairing is that their child was filled with the cast-off evil energies of the inhabitants of Azarath, forming him into their personification. At birth, Trigon killed everyone around him (including his own mother); at the age of one, he ruled the entirety of his homeworld, and at the age of six, he destroyed an entire planet. By the age of 30, he held dominion over millions of worlds in his dimension.

Arella was a depressed woman who decided to join a cult known as the Church of Blood, which was trying to summon Trigon. When the ritual was performed, Trigon, disguised as a handsome male, emerged and married Arella. After the two had sex, Arella discovered Trigon's true nature after seeing his true form. Trigon sends Arella back to Earth, and Arella is pregnant and on the brink of suicide when she is found by an extra-dimensional cult and brought to Azarath, where she gives birth to Raven. Raven is brought up to "control her emotions" to suppress and control the demonic powers she inherited from Trigon. During Raven's childhood, Trigon was aware of her whereabouts, but rarely intervened.

Raven learns of Trigon's intentions to conquer Earth and vows to stop him; she initially approaches the Justice League, but they refuse her on the advice of Zatanna, who senses her demonic parentage. In desperation, she reforms the Teen Titans to battle Trigon, eventually sealing him in another dimension.

Trigon escapes and comes to Earth, taking control of Raven and destroying Azarath. The Titans attempt to fight Trigon, but are contaminated by his demonic influence and kill Raven. This allowed the souls of Azarath to possess her and use her as a channel to kill Trigon with purifying light. Although Trigon is gone, his followers, led by Brother Blood, have tried to revive him several times.

The sons of Trigon as depicted in Titans (vol. 2) #3 (2008).

=== The Sons of Trigon ===
Raven notices that Trigon has returned and is responsible for the recent attacks on past and present members of the Teen Titans. The cause of his resurrection has not been revealed, but the motive for these renewed attack is that a war with rival demons has spread Trigon's forces too thinly and left him desperately weak, which forces him to turn his focus on Earth in hopes of creating a new power base.

Three of Trigon's sons, Jacob, Jared and Jesse, play a significant role in his return to life. The brothers can respectively induce the seven deadly sins of wrath, lust, and envy in others. They attempt to open the portal to Trigon's realm, but then betray their father and steal what little power he has left; this actually makes Trigon proud of them for proving to be just as evil as he is. The trio leave, thinking they have gained great power, and Trigon is left trapped in his realm. However, the three brothers then return and corrupt Raven, making her their ally. Eventually, they are defeated by Raven and the Titans.

=== The New 52 ===
In September 2011, The New 52 rebooted DC's continuity. This version of Trigon has six eyes. He has struck a bargain with the Phantom Stranger to return his offspring Raven (living under the assumed name of Rachel Roth) to him; in return, he pledges to spare Earth from his armies that were ready to search the Earth for her, having already destroyed Azarath years ago. In The New 52, it is revealed that Trigon has at least four children: Belial, Ruskoff, Suge, and Raven. Additionally, Trigon rules six kingdoms known as the Under-Realms and attempted to pass leadership of them to Raven.

In Red Hood and the Outlaws, Trigon is killed by Bizarro. He is later revealed to have been resurrected.

== Powers and abilities ==
Trigon is a demon who possesses vast mystical abilities. He has superhuman physical abilities and can fly, generate energy blasts, teleport, manipulate matter, resurrect the dead, alter time, reconstruct reality, warp universal forces, shapeshift, devour souls, control the minds of others, and generate illusions.

== Other versions ==
- An alternate universe version of Trigon appears in DC Bombshells. This version is Das Trigon, a German mountain spirit, who is later killed by Faora.
- An alternate universe version of Trigon appears in Tiny Titans. This version is a silly, bumbling, but devoted father and friend of Principal Slade.

== In other media ==
=== Television ===
Trigon as he appears in Teen Titans (2003).

- Trigon appears in Teen Titans (2003), voiced initially by Keith Szarabajka and subsequently by Kevin Michael Richardson. Due to his vast abilities, Trigon was difficult for the series' creators to write, which led to them adapting the "Terror of Trigon" storyline since its writers faced a similar problem and were able to devise a solution. Following a minor appearance in the first season episode "Nevermore", in which a mental projection of Trigon appears in Raven's mind, Trigon properly appears in the fourth season, in which he resurrects and tasks Slade with forcing Raven to release him. In the three-part season finale "The End", Trigon destroys Earth, though Raven secretly saves the Teen Titans, whom Slade joins in fighting Trigon after being betrayed by him. They mount an assault against Trigon until Robin rescues Raven, allowing her to kill him and undo his destruction.
- Trigon appears in the "New Teen Titans" segment of DC Nation Shorts, voiced again by Kevin Michael Richardson.
- Trigon appears in Teen Titans Go! (2013), voiced again by Kevin Michael Richardson. This version is a bumbling father figure who wants what is best for his daughter, which involves her accepting her demonic heritage and joining him in destroying universes.
- Trigon appears in Titans, portrayed by Seamus Dever in the first two seasons and voiced and motion-captured by Craig Burnatowski in the fourth season. This version created the "Organization" to locate his daughter Rachel Roth. In pursuit of his quest, he traps Dick Grayson in an illusionary world where Batman kills his enemies to make the former embrace his inner darkness and breaks Roth's will by making her believe her friends had beat Gar Logan to death. With Roth under his control, Trigon starts to destroy Earth until Gar helps Roth break his control, save Grayson, and defeat her father before sealing him in a jewel. In the fourth season, the Church of Blood release Trigon so their leader Brother Blood can steal his heart and drink his blood.

=== Film ===
- Trigon appears in the DC Animated Movie Universe (DCAMU) film Justice League vs. Teen Titans, voiced by Jon Bernthal. This version can create and send demons to possess others, such as Ra's al Ghul, and created the Lazarus Pits. Trigon battles the Teen Titans and Justice League until they join forces to defeat him, with Raven sealing him in a crystal shard.
- The Teen Titans Go! (2013) and Teen Titans (2003) incarnations of Trigon appear in Teen Titans Go! vs. Teen Titans, with both voiced again by Kevin Michael Richardson. The former disguises himself as the "Master of Games" (voiced by Rhys Darby) to pit their respective versions of the Teen Titans against each other and use the battle to absorb his version of Raven's powers so he can resurrect his 2003 counterpart and join forces to conquer the multiverse. However, 2003 Trigon belittles his 2013 counterpart, causing the latter to absorb him and transform into Hexagon. With help from their multiversal counterparts, the two Titans groups take Raven's powers back, destroy the 2003 Trigon, and trap 2013 Trigon in a zombie-infested universe.
- Trigon appears in the DCAMU film Justice League Dark: Apokolips War, voiced by John DiMaggio. Despite his imprisonment, he helps Raven survive Darkseid's invasion of Earth, gradually weakening her in the process. After Robin is killed trying to save Batman, Raven inadvertently frees Trigon, who possesses Superman, kills John Constantine, and battles Darkseid until Superman breaks free upon witnessing Lois Lane's death. Raven and a revived Constantine combine their powers to restore Trigon's body before Cyborg sacrifices himself to transport Trigon and Darkseid into oblivion.

=== Video games ===
- Trigon appears in Teen Titans (2005), voiced again by Kevin Michael Richardson.
- Trigon appears as a playable character in Teen Titans (2006).
- Trigon appears in DC Universe Online. This version is served by numerous demonic minions: Demons, Embodiments of Sin, Soul Reavers, Soul Screams, Soul Shadows, Soul Strikers, Possessed Students, and Volatile Succubi. Additionally, the Sons of Trigon appear via a self-titled DLC, consisting of Jared, who possesses Jacob's powers, and original characters James, Jack, and Julius, who can respectively induce greed, sloth, and gluttony.
- Trigon appears in Injustice: Gods Among Us. In the game's story, Raven succumbs to his influence, assumes a demonic appearance, and becomes an enforcer in Superman's Regime. He also appears as a boss in the S.T.A.R. Labs side missions and in Raven and Scorpion's non-canonical arcade mode endings.
- Trigon appears as a character summon in Scribblenauts Unmasked: A DC Comics Adventure.
- Trigon appears in Teeny Titans.
- Trigon appears as a playable character in Lego DC Super-Villains, voiced by Darin De Paul.

=== Miscellaneous ===
- The Sons of Trigon appear in Smallville Season 11: Harbinger.
- Raven's mental projection of Trigon appears in Teen Titans Go! (2004) #5.
- A human character based on Trigon named Roger Trigon appears in the Arrow tie-in novel Arrow: Vengeance. This version is the founder and head priest of the Church of Blood and the head of Starling City's Zandia Orphanage who personally recruits Sebastian Blood and Cyrus Gold before dying prior to the events of Arrow's second season, with Blood and Gold respectively taking over the Church of Blood and orphanage.
- Trigon appears in DC Super Hero Girls, voiced again by Kevin Michael Richardson. This version is more forgiving than other incarnations, allowing Raven to attend Super Hero High and eventually taking part in various parent boards and activities as well.
- Trigon appears in the Injustice: Gods Among Us prequel comic.
