= Curran Walters =

American actor, model (b.1998)

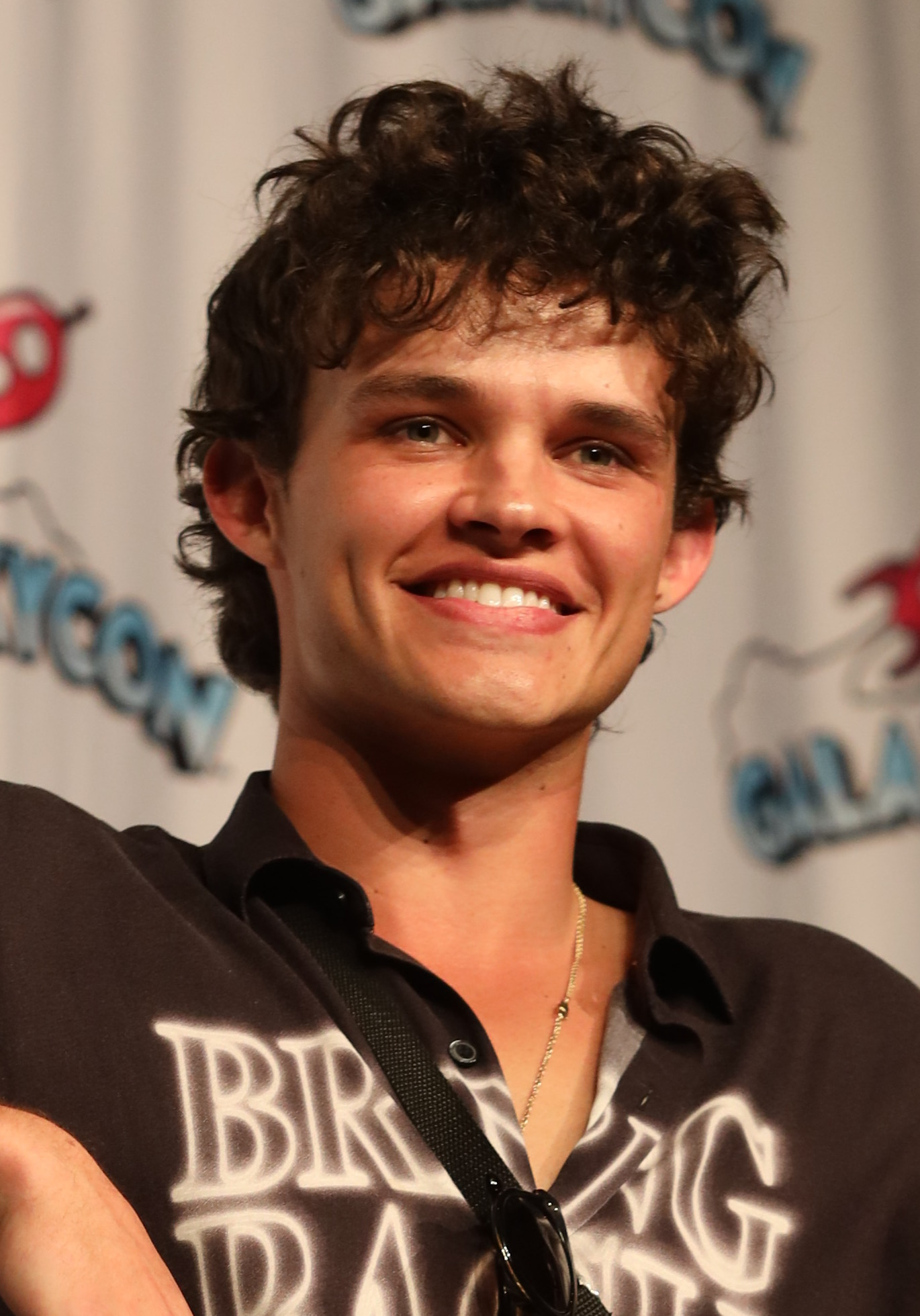
- Walters at GalaxyCon Richmond in 2022
- Born: January 16, 1998 (age 28); Oak Park, California, U.S.
- Occupations: Actor, model
- Years active: 2014–present
- Height: 1.75 m (5 ft 9 in)

Curran Walters (born January 16, 1998) is an American actor and model. He is best known for portraying Jason Todd in the DC Comics television series Titans (2018–2023).

== Early life ==
Walters was born on January 16, 1998, in Oak Park, California and attended Oak Park High School. He has two sisters (Raquel and Harlow) and one brother (River).

== Career ==
He began modeling for fashion brands including Tillys and Lee. He began his acting career in commercials for Samsung Galaxy and the sports video game NBA 2K15. He made his television debut in the comedy film Growing Up and Down in 2014. Curran got more roles on television, including his recurring role as "Young Jackson" in the series Game of Silence in 2016. He also appeared in the first and second two-part episode (8 & 9) of "Girl Meets Ski Lodge" in 2016 during the third season of Girl Meets World as Evan. Other television credits include Too Close to Home in 2016, Alexa & Katie in 2018, and the 2016 sitcom Speechless.

He made his second film appearance in the comedy-drama 20th Century Women in 2016, starring Annette Bening, Elle Fanning and Greta Gerwig. Walters made his third film appearance in the science fiction film for television Playing Dead in 2018.

Walters made his breakthrough as Jason Todd, the second Robin, in the fifth episode of Titans and had a recurring role in the series throughout the rest of the first season. For the second season in 2019, Walters returned as a series regular. He is the first live action portrayal of Jason Todd in the character's history. He booked the role after just one audition after the callbacks were canceled. He later appeared as the character in the CW's Arrowverse crossover event "Crisis on Infinite Earths", alongside Alan Ritchson's Hawk, via archive footage from the first season of Titans. Walters returned for the third season of Titans, where his character took up the mantle of Red Hood. He reprised his role for one episode of the fourth and final season of Titans, though he was still billed as a main cast member.

He appeared in the 2019 horror film Do Not Reply.

In November 2024, Walters was announced as a cast member in independent drama Out Come The Wolves, based on the Rancid 1995 album of the same name.

== Filmography ==
=== Film ===
Year	Title	Role	Notes
2016	20th Century Women	Matt	
2019	Do Not Reply	Dylan	

=== Television ===
Year	Title	Role	Notes
2014	Growing Up and Down	Chad	Television film
2015	New Girl	Young Jake Apex	Episode: "Oregon"
2016	Game of Silence	Young Jackson Brooks	Recurring role; 5 episodes
2016	Girl Meets World	Evan	2 episodes
2016–2017	Too Close to Home	Mac	Main role
2018	Speechless	Xander	Episode: "N-E-- NEW Y-- YEAR'S E-- EVE"
2018	Alexa & Katie	Gabriel	Episode: "Winter Luau"
2018	Best.Worst.Weekend.Ever.	Patches	2 episodes
2018	Playing Dead	Lucas	Television film
2018–2022	Titans	Jason Todd / Robin / Red Hood	25 episodes, recurring: season 1, main (season 2–3)
2019	Fam	Kyle	Episode: "Pregnancy Pause"
