= Anna Diop =

Senegalese actress (b. 1988)

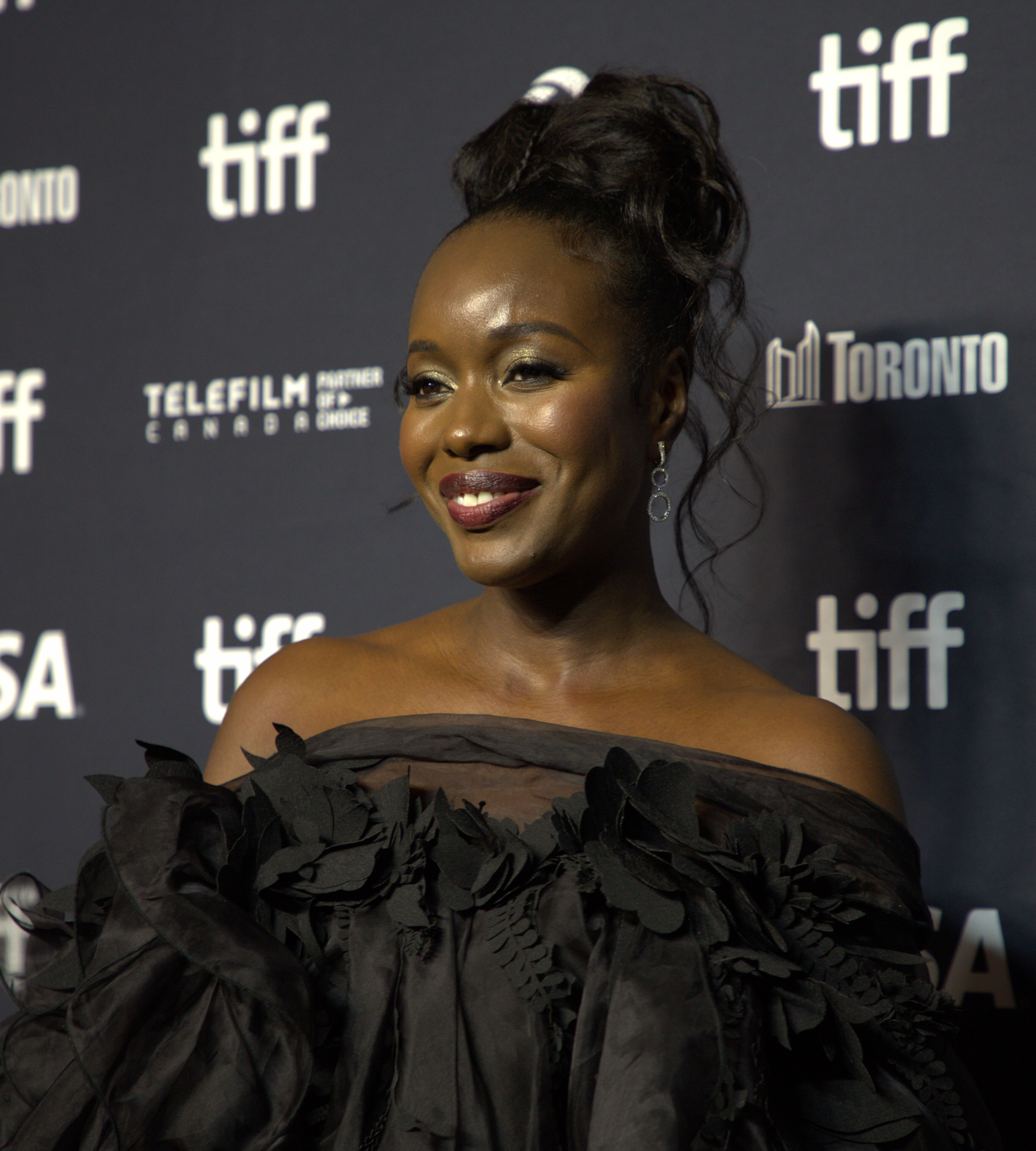
- Diop in 2025
- Born: Mame-Anna Diop; February 6, 1988 (age 38); Senegal
- Occupation: Actress
- Years active: 2006–present
- Known for: Titans

Mame-Anna Diop (born February 6, 1988) is a Senegalese-American actress and model. Her first major roles were as a series regular on The CW supernatural mystery The Messengers (2015) and the Fox thriller 24: Legacy (2017). Diop achieved further prominence for portraying Kory Anders / Starfire on the DC Universe / HBO Max series Titans from 2018 to 2023. Outside of television, she headlined the psychological thriller film Nanny (2022).

== Biography ==
Diop was born in Senegal and moved to the United States at age six. She moved to New York at age 16 to pursue a career in acting and modeling. In 2006, she made her television debut in a recurring role on Everybody Hates Chris. In the following years, she guest starred on Lincoln Heights, Whitney, and Touch. Diop had a role in the 2013 film The Moment. In 2015, Diop starred as Rose Arvale in the short-lived supernatural drama series The Messengers. Later that year, she appeared in the thriller series Quantico and was cast in a recurring role on Oprah's drama series Greenleaf. In 2017, Diop was a series regular in the series 24: Legacy. In the DC Universe superhero series Titans (2018–2023), Diop plays the extraterrestrial princess and heroine Starfire. In 2018, Diop was cast in the horror film Us directed by Jordan Peele.

On October 16, 2022, Diop was given the Spotlight Award at the Newport Beach Film Festival.

== Filmography ==
=== Film ===
Year	Title	Role	Notes
2011	Second Date Roxy	Layla Tase	Short
2013	The Moment	Hawa	
2013	While Expecting Cassius	Angela	Short
2013	Mingle	Jennie	TV movie
2013	Double Negative	Laila	Short
2016	Message from the King	Becca	
2017	The Keeping Hours	Kate	
2019	Us	Rayne Thomas/Eartha	
2021	Something About Her	Anna	
2022	Nanny	Aisha	
2023	The Book of Clarence	Varinia	
2025	The Man in My Basement	Narciss Gully	
2026	Strung	Imani Walker	

=== Television ===
Year	Title	Role	Notes
2006–08	Everybody Hates Chris	Diedra	Recurring cast: season 2–3
2007	Lincoln Heights	Sharon	Episode: "Suspicion"
2011	Whitney	Waitress	Episode: "First Date"
2012	Southland	Girl	Episode: "Wednesday"
2013	Touch	Lila James	Episode: "Perfect Storm"
2015	The Messengers	Rose Arvale	Main cast
2015	Quantico	Mia	Episode: "Found" & "Over"
2016	Greenleaf	Isabel	Recurring cast: season 1
2016–17	24: Legacy	Nicole Carter	Main cast
2018	Bosch	Desiree Zeally	Recurring cast: season 4
2018–2023	Titans	Koriand'r / Kory Anders	Main cast, billed as "Mame-Anna Diop" for season 3 & 4
2026	Scarpetta	Sierra "Tron" Patron	Recurring cast
