= DC Universe Infinite =

Digital comics service

- Logo since 2024
- Developer: DC Comics
- Type: Digital comics subscription service
- Launched: January 21, 2021; 5 years ago
- Platforms: Web, iOS, Android
- Status: Active
- Pricing model: Monthly or annual subscription required to access content
- Website: www.dcuniverseinfinite.com

DC Universe Infinite is an online service by DC Comics that launched on January 21, 2021 and primarily distributes past issues of DC-published comic books over the internet. It is a relaunch of the former DC Universe streaming service, after its video content and original programming was subsumed into HBO Max in 2020.

== History ==
Among the features of the original DC Universe service was a rotating selection of comics published by DC. In August 2020, after DC Comics publisher Jim Lee revealed that all original programming on DC Universe would be migrated over to HBO Max, he spoke to the community aspect of DC Universe, as well as the ability to access the back catalogue of comics titles, saying "there is always going to be a need for that" and that DC was looking at ways to transform the platform so that content would not go away.

The service was relaunched as DC Universe Infinite on January 21, 2021 and became a digital comics service. Infinite would offer newly-published DC Comics titles one year (later shortened to six months) after their retail release date, early access to DC Comics' digital-first titles, exclusive comics created for the service, and access to 24,000 titles from DC's back catalog. DC Universe subscriptions were automatically transferred over to DC Universe Infinite upon its launch. In August 2022, DC Comics rebranded their online presence to be simply "DC", which in turn allowed users to have a similar user profile between DC's website and DC Universe Infinite. In October 2022, a new "Ultra" tier was created that allowed users to read newly published DC comics one month after their physical and digital publications as well as an expanded library of comics including DC's Vertigo and Black Label imprints as well as collected editions.

== Availability ==
At launch, DC Universe Infinite was made available in the United States. It launched in Canada, Australia, and New Zealand on March 29, 2022, and the United Kingdom on April 28. The service was also planned to launch in Brazil and Mexico that year. The service is available on the web and iOS and Android devices.

== See also ==
- Marvel Unlimited
