= DC Universe (streaming service) =

Defunct video-on-demand and digital comic book service

- Website type: Video on demand
- Available in: English
- Dissolved: January 21, 2021; 5 years ago
- Successors: DC Universe Infinite (digital comics); HBO Max (original programming)
- Headquarters: Burbank, California, {{{location_country}}}
- Area served: United States
- Owner: WarnerMedia
- Key people: Sam Ades (GM & SVP, Warner Bros. Digital Networks)
- Services: Streaming service, OTT
- Parent: Warner Bros. Digital Networks; DC Entertainment; Warner Bros. Digital Labs
- Website: www.dcuniverse.com
- Registration: Monthly subscription required to access content
- Launched: September 15, 2018; 8 years ago
- Current status: Defunct

DC Universe was an American subscription video-on-demand (SVOD) and digital comics service operated by DC Entertainment and Warner Bros. Digital Networks, both divisions of WarnerMedia. Launched on September 15, 2018, the service featured a streaming library of animated series and films based on DC Comics properties, new original television series adapted from DC properties, as well as a rotating back catalogue of DC Comics publications, and online community features. In 2020, the service won the Webby People's Voice Award for Media Streaming.

In June 2020, WarnerMedia began to phase out DC Universe in favor of its new flagship streaming service HBO Max, initially by offering a promotional offer via DC Universe for new subscribers. DC Universe was relaunched as DC Universe Infinite—which is solely a digital comics subscription service—on January 21, 2021. DC Universe's original series and future streaming productions were moved to HBO Max and became Max Originals.

== History and development ==
In April 2017, DC Universe was announced as an untitled service with original television programming, with its title revealed a year later in May. The next month, the features of the service beyond original programming were revealed, including access to older DC live-action and animated films and animated series for a select period of time, a rotating selection of comics, forum discussion space, a merchandise store, and DC encyclopedia. Sam Ades, the general manager and senior vice-president at Warner Bros. Digital Network, managed the service.

Several original series were announced and developed for DC Universe: Titans and Young Justice: Outsiders, premiered in 2018 and 2019, respectively. Harley Quinn, a half-hour animated series, premiered in 2019. A Superman prequel series titled Metropolis was announced in January 2018, focusing on Lois Lane and Lex Luthor. Two live-action series Swamp Thing and Doom Patrol were released in 2019, while Metropolis was being redeveloped. A live-action Stargirl series was released in 2020, which features additional members of the Justice Society of America. DC Daily was released in September 2018, ending in July 2020.

In May 2020, WarnerMedia launched a new streaming service, HBO Max. The following month, DC Universe subscribers became eligible for a promotional discount on HBO Max for new subscribers. At the end of July, DC Universe no longer offered the yearly subscription option for the service. In August, DC Comics publisher Jim Lee revealed that all original programming would be migrated over to HBO Max. Speaking to the community aspect of DC Universe, as well as the ability to access the backlog of comics titles, Lee said "there is always going to be a need for that" and that DC was looking at ways to transform the platform so that content would not go away.

Sibling broadcast network The CW (which has carried its "Arrowverse" dramas adapted from DC Comics characters) has also carried selected DC Universe programs, including Stargirl (which aired new episodes on The CW on a one-day delay from its release on DC Universe), and Swamp Thing (acquired for its 2020 fall schedule, amid the impact of the COVID-19 pandemic on television in the United States).

DC announced in September 2020 that the service would change its name to DC Universe Infinite and become solely a digital comics subscription service on January 21, 2021. DC Universe subscriptions would automatically transfer over to DC Universe Infinite. Young Justice seasons 1–4, Titans season 1–3, Doom Patrol seasons 1–3, the first season of Stargirl, and Harley Quinn seasons 1–3 moved to HBO Max to become Max Original series, with new DC series and "key DC classics" also being available there. Stargirl was renewed exclusively by The CW for a second season.

== Availability ==
DC Universe launched in the U.S. on September 15, 2018, and was available on iOS, Android, Roku, Apple TV, Android TV, Amazon Fire TV, and Xbox One in addition to web and mobile web access. Each subscription to DC Universe could be used on two devices at a time. Pre-orders for the streaming service became available starting on July 19, while an early beta-version was made available to select users in August. Live-action series were produced in 4K with HDR.

DC Universe was only available in the United States. At Fan Expo Canada 2018, DC editor Dan DiDio claimed the service was being beta tested in Canada with plans to launch at an unspecified date. Meanwhile, several original shows from the service were acquired by Corus Entertainment (for broadcast on its Teletoon, Adult Swim, and Showcase cable networks), while Doom Patrol was acquired by Bell Media for its CTV Sci-Fi Channel. Titans was distributed internationally on Netflix.

== Content ==
=== Original programming ===
DC Universe original programming
| Title | Genre | Original release | Seasons | Episodes | Notes |
Live-action
| Titans | Action, drama | October 12, 2018 – November 29, 2019 (Note: The listed conclusion date represents the final episode released on DC Universe; this series has continued onwards on a different service.) | 2 | 24 | Internationally distributed by Netflix. The series moved to HBO Max beginning with the third season. |
| Doom Patrol | Comedy drama | February 15, 2019 – August 6, 2020 | 2 | 24 | Co-production and distribution with HBO Max starting with season 2. The series moved to HBO Max beginning with the third season. |
| Swamp Thing | Horror | May 31, 2019 – August 2, 2019 | 1 | 10 | Cancelled |
| Stargirl | Action, drama | May 18, 2020 – August 10, 2020 | 1 | 13 | Episodes aired the next day on The CW. Renewed by The CW for a second season which aired exclusively on the network. The first season became available on HBO Max when the service changed to DC Universe Infinite. |
Animation
| Young Justice | Animated, action | January 4, 2019 – August 27, 2019 | 1 | 26 | Acquired from Cartoon Network starting with Outsiders. The series moved to HBO Max, starting with the fourth season. |
| Harley Quinn | Adult animation, action, black comedy | November 29, 2019 – June 26, 2020 | 2 | 26 | The series moved to HBO Max, starting with the third season. |
Other
| DC Daily | News program | September 15, 2018 – July 3, 2020 | —N/a | 450 | Ended |
| DC Universe All Star Games | Game show | February 28, 2020 – March 27, 2020 | 1 | 6 | Ended |

BizarroTV, an anthology series, was announced in October 2019 as being in development, and had an expected release date in 2020. It was unclear if it would have migrated to an HBO Max Original series when the service became DC Universe Infinite.

=== Films and television series ===
At launch, the service included the four live-action Christopher Reeve Superman films, Batman Begins and The Dark Knight, the animated television series Batman: The Animated Series, Static Shock, Young Justice, Teen Titans, Batman Beyond, Batman: The Brave and the Bold, and Justice League, the live-action television series Lois & Clark: The New Adventures of Superman and Wonder Woman, the last remastered in high-definition, and animated films including Justice League: The Flashpoint Paradox, Green Lantern: First Flight, and Wonder Woman, among others. Content was updated on a monthly basis. The service added the 1970s live-action series Shazam! in March the following year.

== Accolades ==
DC Universe won the 2020 Webby People's Voice Award for Media Streaming in the category Web.
