= Pressure point (disambiguation) =

A pressure point is an area on the human body that may produce significant pain or other effects when manipulated.

Pressure point may also refer to:

== Medicine ==
- Pressure point (first aid), a point on the body where direct pressure is applied to constrict blood flow in the event of bleeding

== Alternative medicine ==
- Acupuncture point, in traditional Chinese medicine
- Varmam, the corresponding concept in Tamil traditional medicine and martial arts
- Reflex points, in reflexology

== Arts and entertainment ==
- Pressure Point (1962 film), starring Sidney Poitier and Bobby Darin
- Pressure Point (2001 film), a Canadian film
- Pressure Point (1997 film), 1997 American film directed by David Giancola
- Pressure Point (album), by Freestylers
- "Pressure Point" (song), from The Zutons' 2004 album Who Killed...... The Zutons?
- Pressure Points: Live in Concert, a 1984 live album by progressive rock band Camel
