= Cicada 3301 =

Internet puzzle and mystery

Cicada 3301 logo

Cicada 3301 is the name given to three sets of puzzles posted online under the name "3301" between 2012 and 2014. The first puzzle started on January 4, 2012, on 4chan, and ran for nearly a month. A second round began on January 4, 2013, and a third round was posted on Twitter on January 4, 2014. The third puzzle remains unsolved. The stated intent was to recruit "intelligent individuals" by presenting a series of puzzles to be solved. A new clue was posted on Twitter on January 5, 2016. Cicada 3301 posted their last verified OpenPGP-signed message in April 2017, denying the validity of any unsigned puzzle.

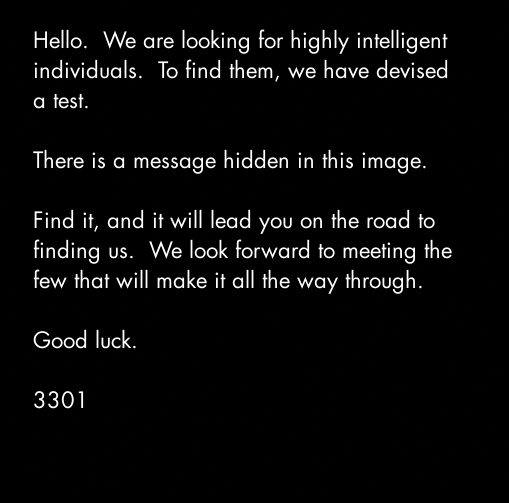
The first message of Cicada 3301 posted on 4chan, beginning the first set of puzzles

The puzzles focused heavily on data security, cryptography, steganography, and Internet anonymity. It has been called "the most elaborate and mysterious puzzle of the Internet age", and is listed as one of the "top 5 eeriest, unsolved mysteries of the Internet" by The Washington Post, and much speculation exists as to its function. Many have speculated that the puzzles are a recruitment tool for the NSA, CIA, MI6, Mossad, a "Masonic conspiracy", or a cyber mercenary group. Others have stated Cicada 3301 is an alternate reality game, although no company or individual has attempted to monetize it.

== Purpose ==
The stated purpose of the puzzles each year was to recruit "highly intelligent individuals", although the ultimate purpose remains unknown. Theories have included claims that Cicada 3301 is a secret society with the goal of improving cryptography, privacy, and anonymity or that it is a cult or religion. According to statements of several people who solved the 2012 puzzle, 3301 typically uses non-puzzle-based recruiting methods, but created the Cicada puzzles because they were looking for potential members with cryptography and computer security skills.

== Resolution ==
The first puzzle of 2013 was solved by Marcus Wanner. According to him, those who solved the puzzles were asked questions about their support of information freedom, online privacy and freedom, and rejection of censorship. Those who answered satisfactorily at this stage were invited to a private forum, where they were instructed to devise and complete a project intended to further the ideals of the group. A fellow winner documented her experience with the project on her YouTube account, "Nox Populi". Its description reads: "A series by one of the 2013 winners of the Cicada 3301 puzzle, showing the step by step solving process as well as discussing a more realistic, fact based view of the organization." Currently, she facilitates community efforts surrounding Cicada 3301 on a Discord server. Other communities of solvers are still found on message boards and forums.

=== Types of clues ===
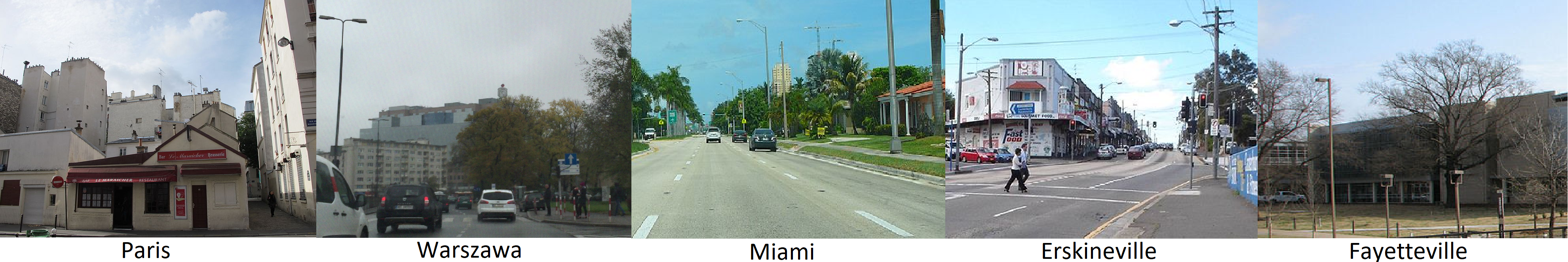
Locations of the physical paper signs from the 2012 puzzle

The Cicada 3301 puzzles used both online and physical clues, including digital images containing hidden information, a telephone message, websites, and paper signs bearing QR codes. Solvers encountered cryptographic and steganographic techniques, along with references to literature, poetry, art, and music. Each clue was signed by the same OpenPGP private key to confirm authenticity.

== Allegations of illegal activity ==
In 2012, the Investigative Police (PDI) in the Los Andes Province of Chile claimed that Cicada 3301 is a "hacker group" and engaged in illegal activities. Cicada 3301 responded by issuing a PGP-signed statement denying any involvement in illegal activity.

In July 2015, a group calling themselves "3301" hacked into Planned Parenthood's database; however, the group appeared to have had no association with Cicada 3301. Cicada 3301 issued a PGP-signed statement saying that they "are not associated with this group in any way, nor do [Cicada 3301] condone their use of our name, number, or symbolism". The hacker group later confirmed that they were not affiliated with Cicada 3301.

== Legacy and popular culture ==
The United States Navy released a cryptographic challenge based on the Cicada 3301 recruitment puzzles in 2014, calling it Project Architeuthis.

The plot of "Nautilus", a 2015 episode of Person of Interest, featured a large-scale game very similar to the Cicada 3301 puzzles. Both feature a series of worldwide cryptographic puzzles; as the title implies, these feature the image of a nautilus shell instead of a cicada logo. Person of Interest creator Jonathan Nolan and producer Greg Plageman said in an interview that Cicada 3301 was the inspiration for the episode: "I'm particularly fascinated by the subject underneath ["Nautilus"]. Look up Cicada 3301 on the Internet. It's a very interesting concept out there that we then put into a larger story that connects to our show".

The organization is the subject of the 2021 comedy-thriller film Dark Web: Cicada 3301. Directed by Alan Ritchson, who co-wrote the script with Joshua Montcalm, it stars Jack Kesy, Conor Leslie, Ron Funches, Kris Holden-Ried, Andreas Apergis, and director Ritchson. The film follows a hacker who participates in Cicada's recruitment game while evading the National Security Agency (NSA).

== See also ==
- 11B-X-1371
- Agrippa (A Book of the Dead), a poem used in the puzzle
- Cypherpunk
- Mass collaboration
- Secret society
- Mabinogion, another poem used in the puzzle
- The Book of the Law, a book used in the puzzle
