= Conor Leslie =

American actress (born 1991)

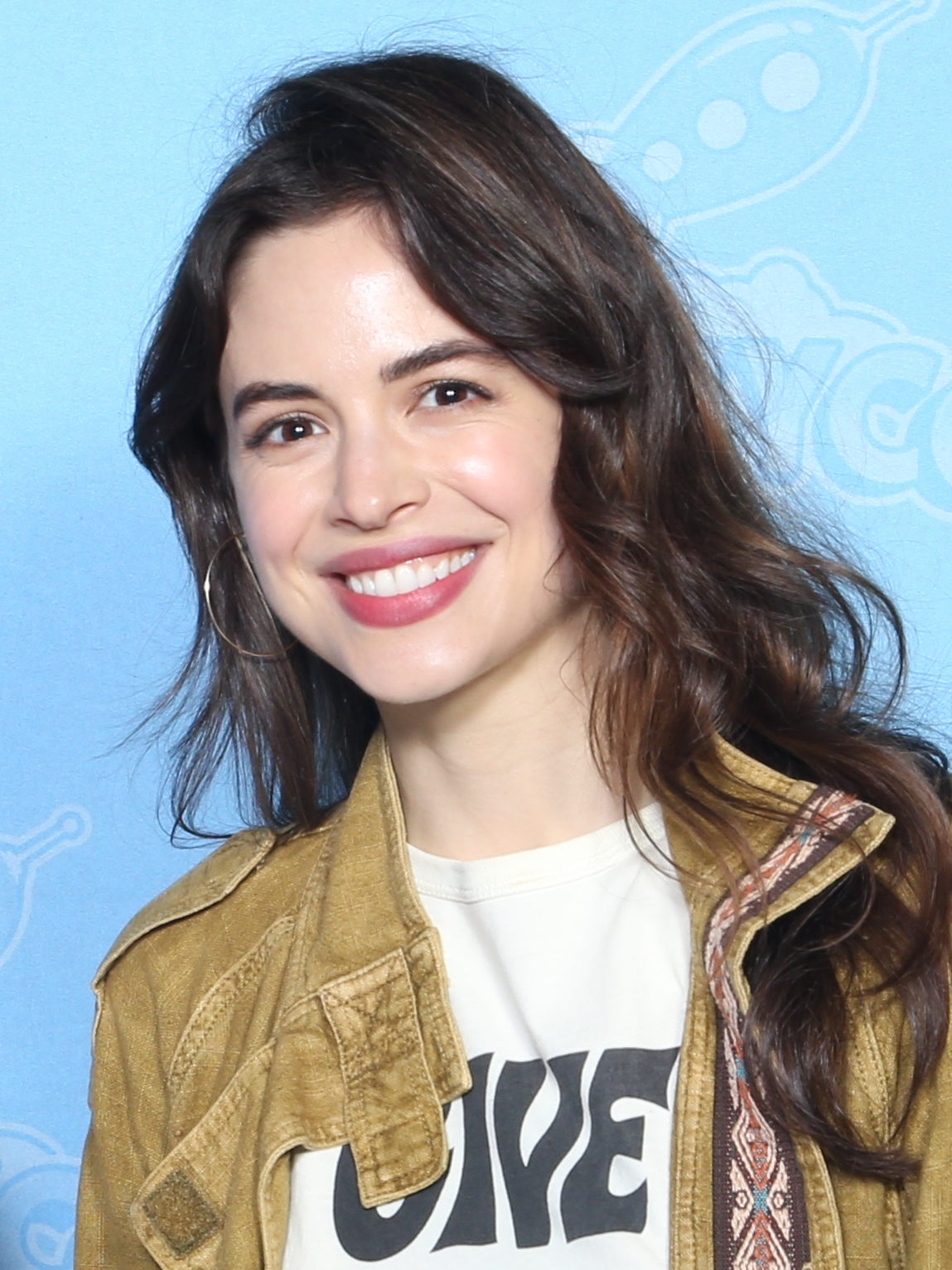
- Leslie at the 2022 GalaxyCon Richmond
- Born: Conor Marie Leslie; April 10, 1991 (age 35); Livingston, New Jersey, U.S.
- Occupation: Actress
- Years active: 2006–present
- Spouse: Brett Dier (m. 2026)

Conor Marie Leslie (born April 10, 1991) is an American actress. Beginning her career in the late 2000s, her first major role was in the thriller film Chained (2012). She has worked frequently on television, including as a series regular on the Discovery Channel historical Western Klondike (2014), the Yahoo! Screen science fiction comedy Other Space (2015), and the Fox crime drama Shots Fired (2017). From 2015 to 2018, she also appeared on the first three seasons of the Amazon Prime Video alternate history thriller The Man in the High Castle. Leslie gained further prominence for portraying Donna Troy / Wonder Girl on the DC Universe / HBO Max superhero series Titans (2018–2021) and was part of the main cast during the second and third seasons.

== Early life ==
Leslie was born in Livingston, New Jersey and resided in Millburn. Along with acting, Leslie developed an interest in photography. She attended Millburn High School, graduating as a junior in 2008, and subsequently moved to New York City.

== Career ==
=== 2006–2011: Early work ===
After appearing in commercials with a friend, Leslie said she became dedicated to her acting career at age 15. She was cast in the Spike Lee-directed pilot for M.O.N.Y. in 2007, but the pilot did not receive a series order. Her television debut came in 2009 with a guest appearance on The Unusuals as Karen Delmonte, the high school girlfriend of Detective Eric Delahoy. The following year, she played Eliza, a 17-year-old caught exposing herself on webcam in the series finale of Law & Order, Mia Caruso, a magazine intern whose publisher is murdered on Law & Order: Criminal Intent, and flirtatious student Parker on 90210. She also made her film debut in Beware the Gonzo as Amy, a popular high school student. Leslie's guest roles on television continued in 2011 with an appearance on No Ordinary Family as Chloe Cotten, a new friend of the Powell family.

=== 2012–2014: First major roles ===
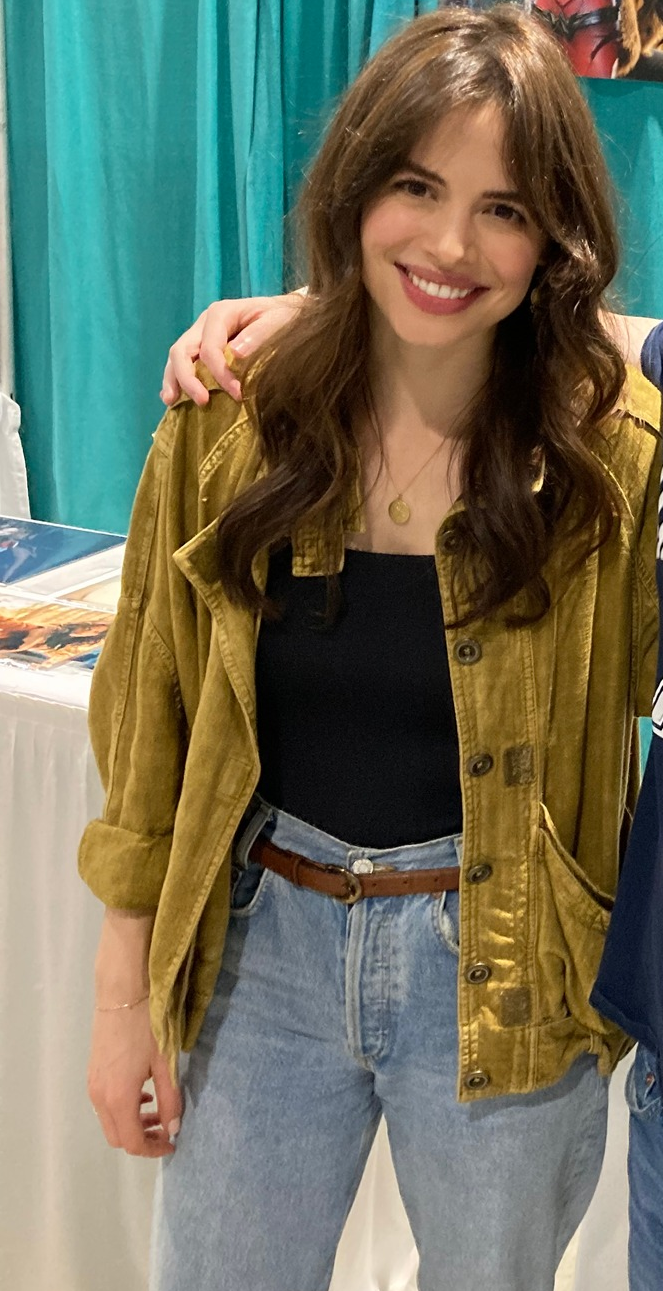
Leslie at the 2022 GalaxyCon Richmond

In 2012, Leslie portrayed Angie in the psychological thriller film Chained, a young woman abducted by a serial killer to be murdered by his reluctant apprentice. DVD Talk reviewer Jamie S. Rich praised her performance and although critical of the overall film, wrote that Leslie played her character "with heartbreaking gravity".

After being cast in the unaired pilot for Widow Detective, Leslie appeared on the series Rizzoli & Isles as Ms. Barlow, the law clerk of a murdered judge, and Revenge as Bianca, a maid working for the Grayson family, in 2013. She also played enigmatic college student Greta in Campus Life, a 2013 film created for the website JumpView. A re-edited version of the film was later released to home media in 2015 as Campus Code. Additionally, Leslie was featured in the music video for the Dan Godlin song "Did She Look" as Godlin's love interest.

Leslie landed her first series regular role as young courtesan Sabine on Klondike, a Discovery Channel miniseries about the Klondike Gold Rush. The first scripted series broadcast by the Discovery Channel, it aired in early 2014. She also appeared as sociopath Kelly Donovan on an episode of Hawaii Five-0 and Des, a former girlfriend of Penn Badgley's character, in the film Parts per Billion during the year.

=== 2015–2017: Continued television appearances ===
Leslie's on-screen appearances in 2015 began with The Man in the High Castle as Trudy Walker, the half-sister of Juliana Crain. Although the character was killed in the first episode, she returned for the second and third seasons, which revealed Trudy was alive in a different timeline. Leslie went on to portray spaceship computer Natasha as a series regular on Yahoo! Screen's science fiction comedy Other Space. Yahoo! Screen would be shut down the following year, preventing the series from being renewed for a second season. In addition to The Man in the High Castle and Other Space, she played Gwen Hollander, the fiancée of a socialite exploited by Tom Keen on the series The Blacklist, Mary Lowe, the sister of a woman believed to have been murdered by her husband on the series Major Crimes, and Nicole, an unrequited love interest of Ricky Mabe's character in the film Dirty Beautiful.

During 2016, Leslie was cast as Molly Parsons, a dating site employee with a tragic background on an episode of Elementary. She was later featured in a recurring role on Graves as Tasha Ludwig, a girlfriend of Jeremy Graves.

In 2017, Leslie played Sarah Ellis, the aide to Helen Hunt's fictional North Carolina governor, as a regular role on Fox's miniseries Shots Fired. Additionally, she portrayed sexual assault victim Holly Greco on an episode of Gone and Amber, a young woman unaware of her boyfriend's homosexuality in the short film Down, directed by her brother Dylan.

=== 2018–present: Lead roles and Titans ===
Leslie starred in the 2018 short film Shrimp as Sasha, a dominatrix at a BDSM den. The short premiered at the Tribeca Film Festival and was picked up by Gunpowder & Sky to become a potential television series.

Later in the year, Leslie became the first actress to portray Donna Troy, the original Wonder Girl, in live-action with her casting on the DC Universe series Titans. Following the character's on-screen introduction in the self-titled eighth episode, Chancellor Agard of Entertainment Weekly described Leslie as "perfect as Donna" and wrote that Donna was "automatically [his] favorite thing about the show". Appearing as a guest star during the first season, Leslie was named a series regular for Titans' second season in 2019. She returned for the third season in 2021, which aired on HBO Max, and departed after the finale.

Between the second and third season of Titans, Leslie appeared in the 2020 music video for the Rhye song "Helpless" as a yoga instructor who becomes the subject of a student's romantic fantasies. She also appeared in the 2021 comedy-thriller film Dark Web: Cicada 3301 as a renegade NSA agent seeking membership to the eponymous organization. The film was directed by her Titans co-star Alan Ritchson, although it also marked the first time they worked together. On casting Leslie, Ritchson described her as "the perfect leading lady".

Following a two-year hiatus, Leslie was announced as the lead of the horror-thriller Archangel in 2024.

== Personal life ==
Leslie married actor Brett Dier in September 2026 after announcing their engagement that January.

== Filmography ==
=== Film ===
Year	Title	Role	Notes
2010	Beware the Gonzo	Amy	
2012	Chained	Angie	
2014	Parts per Billion	Des	
2015	Dirty Beautiful	Nicole	
2015	Campus Code	Greta	Re-edit of Campus Life (2013)
2017	Down	Amber	Short film
2018	Shrimp	Sasha	Short film
2021	Dark Web: Cicada 3301	Gwen	
TBA	Archangel	TBA	

=== Television ===
Year	Title	Role	Notes
2007	M.O.N.Y.	Anabelle Capanelli	Unaired pilot
2009	The Unusuals	Karen Delmonte	Episode: "The Circle Line"
2010	Law & Order	Eliza	Episode: "Rubber Room"
2010	Law & Order: Criminal Intent	Mia Caruso	Episode: "Traffic"
2010	90210	Parker	Episode: "Catch Me If You Cannon"
2011	No Ordinary Family	Chloe Cotten	Episode: "No Ordinary Friends"
2012	Widow Detective	Amanda Jaworski	Unaired pilot
2013	Rizzoli & Isles	Ms. Barlow	Episode: "Judge, Jury and Executioner"
2013–2014	Revenge	Bianca	3 episodes (season 3) (Note: Leslie was credited in the episode "Mercy" and uncredited in the episodes "Endurance" and "Hatred".)
2014	Klondike	Sabine	Main role
2014	Hawaii Five-0	Kelly Donovon	Episode: "Ma lalo o ka 'ili"
2015–2018	The Man in the High Castle	Trudy Walker	Recurring (seasons 1–3)
2015	Other Space	Natasha	Main role
2015	The Blacklist	Gwen Hollander	2 episodes (season 3)
2015	Major Crimes	Mary Lowe	Episode: "Blackout"
2016	Elementary	Molly Parsons	Episode: "To Catch a Predator Predator"
2016–2017	Graves	Tasha Ludwig	Recurring
2017	Shots Fired	Sarah Ellis	Main role
2017	Gone	Holly Greco	Episode: "Ride"
2018–2021	Titans	Donna Troy / Wonder Girl	2 episodes (season 1); Main role (seasons 2–3)

=== Music videos ===
Year	Title	Artist(s)	Ref.
2013	"Did She Look"	Dan Godlin	
2020	"Helpless"	Rhye	
