= Doom Patrol (disambiguation) =

Doom Patrol may refer to:

- Doom Patrol, the DC Comics comic book version of the team
- Doom Patrol (TV series), a TV series based on the DC Comics team
- "Doom Patrol" (Titans episode), an episode of Titans
- Doom Patrol (album), an album by Omar Rodríguez-López
