= Dick Grayson (disambiguation) =

Dick Grayson is a character appearing in DC comics.

Dick Grayson may also refer to:

- Robin (Earth-Two)
- "Dick Grayson" (Titans episode)
- Dick Grayson (Titans character)
