= Chained (2012 film) =

- Promotional poster
- Directed by: Jennifer Lynch
- Screenplay by: Jennifer Lynch
- Story by: Damian O'Donnell
- Produced by: Rhonda Baker; David Buelow; Lee Nelson
- Starring: Vincent D'Onofrio; Eamon Farren; Gina Philips; Conor Leslie; Evan Bird; Jake Weber; Julia Ormond
- Cinematography: Shane Daly
- Edited by: Daryl K. Davis; Chris A. Peterson
- Music by: Climax Golden Twins
- Production company: Anchor Bay Entertainment
- Release date: August 5, 2012 (Fantasia Festival)
- Running time: 94 minutes
- Country: Canada
- Language: English
- Budget: $700,000

Chained is a 2012 Canadian psychological horror film directed by Jennifer Lynch and based on a screenplay by Damian O'Donnell. Starring Vincent D'Onofrio as a serial killer and Eamon Farren as a young prisoner of the killer, it explores their relationship as the killer seeks to turn his captive into his protégé. Gina Philips, Conor Leslie, Jake Weber, and Julia Ormond appear in supporting roles.

The film premiered at the Fantasia International Film Festival and was released direct-to-video in the United States by Anchor Bay Entertainment. It received a polarized response, with some contention over its content and ending, while the performances were praised.

== Plot ==
Sarah Fittler and her nine-year-old son take a taxi to return home from a cinema, but the driver Bob abducts and takes them to his house. As a result of the abuse his father inflicted on him and his brother as children, including forcing him to have sexual intercourse with his own mother, Bob has turned into a serial killer who rapes and murders young women. He kills Sarah and imprisons her son, whom he names Rabbit. When Rabbit tries to escape, Bob chains him to a wall.

Nine years later, the teenage Rabbit remains in Bob's home doing housework, burying the bodies of Bob's victims, and scrap booking newspaper clippings of Bob's victims at his request. While still holding Rabbit captive, Bob tries to become more of a father figure and has Rabbit teach himself human anatomy. To convince Rabbit that nobody else cares for him, Bob reveals that Rabbit's father Brad has remarried. He also releases Rabbit from his chains. In bringing Rabbit closer, Bob intends to turn Rabbit into a serial killer like him.

To complete Rabbit's transformation into a serial killer, Bob asks him to pick a victim from a yearbook. Rabbit initially refuses, but when Bob forces him to select, he chooses a girl named Angie and Bob abducts her. Leaving Rabbit and Angie in a room, Bob warns Rabbit that he will kill her if Rabbit doesn't. Rabbit hesitates and starts to bond with Angie, but stabs her in the stomach when Bob barges in. He then drags her body into the room containing the corpses of past victims. Satisfied, Bob agrees to his request to hunt for another girl.

Bob takes Rabbit to the city with his cab and suggests several victims, but Rabbit declines them all. Along the drive, Bob discovers that Rabbit has written the word "help" on the side of the cab. Bob then realizes that Rabbit stabbed Angie in a non-lethal spot using his anatomy knowledge. He knocks Rabbit unconscious and enters the room where Angie is hiding to kill him. Angie manages to cut Bob's Achilles tendon while Rabbit awakens and comes to save her. In the following struggle, Rabbit kills Bob and buries him next to his victims.

With Bob dead, Rabbit tracks down Brad, now living with his new wife Marie and Rabbit's half-brother Colin. Brad feigns delight about his survival until Rabbit, whose real name is Tim, confronts him with the fact that Brad had arranged the abduction of him and his mother. Through a letter he found, Tim discovered that Bob was Brad's brother, as well as his paternal uncle. Brad, who had urged Sarah to take a taxi on the day of the kidnapping, wanted to get rid of his first wife and son. Brad responds to this revelation by physically assaulting Tim, and also assaulting Marie when she tries to intervene. Tim beats him to death. After Tim leaves at Marie's urging, Marie calls the police and says that a burglar killed her husband.

Tim returns to Bob's house and shuts the garage door. As the closing credits roll, the sounds of him entering the house, opening the fridge, cutting paper, walking back into the garage, entering the cab, and reopening the garage door are heard.

== Cast ==
- Vincent D'Onofrio as Bob
  - Daniel Maslany as Young Bob
- Eamon Farren as Rabbit / Tim Fittler
  - Evan Bird as Young Rabbit
- Julia Ormond as Sarah Fittler
- Conor Leslie as Angie
- Jake Weber as Brad Fittler
  - Michael Maslany as Young Brad
- Gina Philips as Marie

Additionally, Troy Skog and Shannon Jardine portray Bob's parents and Alexander Doerksen plays Colin. Amy Matysio appears as Mary, one of Bob's victims. Director Jennifer Lynch has a cameo as a cooking show host on TV.

== Production ==
The film was shot in Moose Jaw, Saskatchewan, over a period of 15 days. Lynch used the same crew as Surveillance. The original concept came from a script by Damian O'Donnell. Although Lynch liked the script, she felt it was wrong for her, as she did not want to shoot a film in the style of torture porn. The producers explained that they wanted to see her take on the script, so she rewrote it to focus on the characters rather than gratuitous violence. Lynch said that by focusing on the story, she was able to "humanise and explain – though not justify – the devastating behaviour that is a serial killer."

D'Onofrio was drawn to the project by Lynch's involvement, as he had wanted to work with her on Boxing Helena. Lynch had also wanted to work with D'Onofrio, but the role was not specifically written for him. Lynch was drawn to D'Onofrio, who was always her first choice, because the part required an actor that was capable of showing an injured inner child. Because D'Onofrio was willing to do this, Lynch praised his performance as brave. Farren and D'Onofrio worked well together on the set, which D'Onofrio credits for their on-screen chemistry. The actors used very little improvisation. For Bob, D'Onofrio said that he needed to find the character's moral compass, even though Bob is a serial killer. As a character actor, D'Onofrio said that he is drawn to fascinating characters, no matter how flawed. Farren was impressed with Lynch's cover letter for the script reader and got along very well with her when they spoke. On set, Farren and Lynch collaborated easily, and Farren said that she did not need to give much direction to him. Lynch recruited Bird, who played the young Rabbit, over Skype after the casting crew recommended him. Lynch said that his audition tape gave her chills.

The film is a study of how monsters are made, and Lynch says that she wanted to "promote a dialogue about child abuse." Through Bob's back story, Lynch attempted to show how society had turned him into a monster through child abuse. With Rabbit, she wanted to explore the theme of "nature vs nurture". Farren described Rabbit as a stunted child, a nineteen-year-old man who stopped emotionally maturing at nine. Rabbit did not become what Lynch called "a full blown replica of Bob" because he has a loving childhood. This allowed Lynch to compare and contrast how the two men turned out. Lynch did not want to perpetuate the cycle of violence and make Rabbit into a killer, which she said would have been boring.

Lynch was contractually obligated to keep the film to a certain run time, so she had to abbreviate the plot twist. Although she recognizes that some people find it to be tacked on, she said that a director's cut would expand on it and make it more natural. The ending scene is meant to be hopeful, and Lynch says that she sees it as both realistic and happy.

== Release ==
Chained had its world premiere at the Fantasia Festival in Montreal on 5 August 2012. Anchor Bay Entertainment released it direct-to-video on DVD and Blu-ray in the US on 2 October 2012. Although there was money budgeted for a director's cut, they had to use it in other areas. Lynch still wants to do a director's cut eventually.

The film was originally rated NC-17 by the MPAA for "some explicit violence". Lynch appealed the rating, but it was upheld. She later edited the film to achieve an R rating. Kevin Carney of Anchor Bay said that films with comparable violence were rated R for arbitrary reasons, and Lynch said that her films were targeted with NC-17 ratings for their authenticity and intensity, which, according to her, "rewards a casual attitude toward violence." Lynch later said that NC-17 had failed, as audiences still associated it with the old X rating. The NC-17 scene that was cut, which depicts a more graphic version of Mary's (Amy Matysio) death, is included as a special feature.

Lynch stated that she would have preferred to release the film under its working title Rabbit, but the studio would not comply.

== Reception ==
The film drew a polarized response from critics. Negatively comparing it to Jennifer Lynch's debut Boxing Helena in terms of misogyny, Dennis Harvey of Variety called it "a repugnant exercise in physical and psychological sadism" and "a redundant wallow in arted-up, torture-porn cruelty". Peter Bradshaw of The Guardian and Tim Robey of The Daily Telegraph both rated it one out of five, with Bradshaw calling it a "fantastically crass and fatuous serial-killer movie" and Robey calling it "a lurid disgrace". David Hughes of Empire rated it two out of five and described it as "plenty nasty but singularly lacking in clever new twists on a weary genre". Jamie S. Rich of DVD Talk rated it one and a half out of five, criticizing Vincent D'Onofrio's performance as "kind of comical" and the ending as "increasingly ridiculous", although he praised the sequence between Rabbit and Angie and Conor Leslie's performance.

Matt Glasby of Total Film rated it three out of five and called it a "tense serial killer thriller", with the ending being his only main point of contention. Rod Lott of the Oklahoma Gazette praised the first half of the film as "absorbing and tense", and while finding the second half to be less-interesting, noted that "Lynch does not compromise in her direction, nor shy away from depicting depravity" throughout the entire film. Scott A. Gray of Exclaim! wrote that it is a "deeply disturbing, but deeply human look at the causation of cyclical violence". Simon Foster of the Special Broadcasting Service rated it three and a half out of five and called it a "bleak, claustrophobic and brutal serial killer drama". Scott Weinberg of Fearnet described the film as "a stark, unpredictable, and frequently ugly rumination on themes like free will and morality" and "deserves credit for trying to mine some relatively intelligent chills out of something different, topical, and primally disturbing". Lauren Taylor of Bloody Disgusting rated it four out of five and wrote, "Chained takes a typical tale of an abused child growing up to become a serial killer and makes it something that is Oscar worthy", with praise for D'Onofrio's performance. Serena Whitney of Dread Central rated it three and a half out of five and wrote, "Not since American Psycho have audiences experienced a clever dissection of the appalling misogyny displayed in the serial killer subgenre from a female perspective". Bill Gibron of DVD Verdict concluded that Chained "stumbles a bit yet still manages to crawl under your skin and creep you out".

On Rotten Tomatoes, the film has a 62% approval rating based on 21 reviews, with an average rating of 4.8/10.
