= Victoria Snow =

Canadian actress (born 1954/55)

Victoria Snow (born 1954/55) is a Canadian actress. She is best known for her recurring roles as Mary Margaret Skalany in Kung Fu: The Legend Continues and Dee White in Cra$h & Burn, and her starring role as Frances Hunter in Paradise Falls.

== Career ==
Born in Ancaster, Ontario, Snow had her first break as an actress when she was promoted from a minor role to the lead in a Stratford Festival production of the musical Happy New Year in 1979, after original lead Virginia Sandifur was forced to withdraw due to illness.

== Career ==
Snow played the lead role in a production of Medea, directed by John Neville at Halifax's Neptune Theatre, and played Nancy Blake in a 1985 production of The Women at the Shaw Festival.

She has also had supporting or guest roles in the series 9B, E.N.G., Katts and Dog, The Newsroom, Traders, Total Recall 2070, Queer as Folk, Blue Murder, This Is Wonderland, Flashpoint, Republic of Doyle, Warehouse 13, Haven and Slasher, the television films True Confessions of a Hollywood Starlet, Thicker Than Blood: The Larry McLinden Story, Anne of Green Gables: The Continuing Story and Waking Up Wally: The Walter Gretzky Story, and the theatrical films Millennium and Stardom.

Snow portrayed the mother of Bryan Mills (Clive Standen) in the television series Taken, a prequel to the film trilogy of the same name, in 2017 and 2018. In 2021, she appeared as a federal judge in the film Dark Web: Cicada 3301.

=== Awards ===
Snow is a two-time Gemini Award winner, winning Best Lead Actress in a Dramatic Program or Mini-Series at the 3rd Gemini Awards in 1988 for Daughters of the Country and Best Guest Performance in a Series at the 5th Gemini Awards in 1990 for an episode of Street Legal. She was also a nominee for Best Actress in a Continuing Leading Dramatic Role at the 20th Gemini Awards in 2005 and the 25th Gemini Awards in 2010 for Paradise Falls, and a nominee for Best Actress in a Dramatic Program or Mini-Series at the 21st Gemini Awards in 2006 for her performance as Phyllis Gretzky in Waking Up Walter: The Walter Gretzky Story.

== Filmography ==
=== Film ===
Year	Title	Role	Notes
1986	The Wake	Joan Laboucane	
1988	A New Life	Audrey	
1989	Destiny to Order	Mellie	
1989	Millennium	Pinky Djakarta	
1995	Jungleground	Sgt. Purdy	
1995	Iron Eagle on the Attack	Amanda Kirke	
1995	The Feeler	Lina	
1997	Double Take	Real Estate Lady	
1998	Yellow Wedding	Dale	
2000	Stardom	Tina's Mother	
2001	Pressure Point	Haley Griffin	
2001	The Safety of Objects	Jill	
2002	Men with Brooms	Officer Frances Darte	
2006	One Way	Helen Drake	
2008	The Last Hit Man	Marion	
2009	The Jazzman	Karen Kaddly	
2010	St. Roz	Minnie Barr	
2019	Georgetown	Peggy Mason	
2019	Random Acts of Violence	Borden	
2021	Dark Web: Cicada 3301	Judge Mary Collins	

=== Television ===
Year	Title	Role	Notes
1983	The Accident	Reporter	Television film
1985, 1986	Check It Out!	Woman Doctor / Lt. Conway	2 episodes
1986	Philip Marlowe, Private Eye	Reporter	Episode: "Pickup on Noon Street"
1987	Adderly	Angela Gasperini	Episode: "Debbie Does Dishes"
1988	T. and T.	Debbie / Donna	2 episodes
1988	9B	Rhea Burnham	3 episodes
1988–1992	Katts and Dog	Virginia	3 episodes
1989	War of the Worlds	Blade	Episode: "Seft of Emun"
1989	Street Legal	Diane Abbot	Episode: "The Cradle Will Rock"
1989	Love and Hate	Ellie Hubiak	Television film
1989	Lady in the Corner	Ann Henshaw	Television film
1990	The Kissing Place	Casey Edelson	Television film
1990	Getting Married in Buffalo Jump	Eleanor	Television film
1990	Leona Helmsley: The Queen of Mean	Marilyn Norrito	Television film
1990	The Hitchhiker	Jude	Episode: "Riding the Nightmare"
1990–1991	E.N.G.	Eline	2 episodes
1991	Top Cops	Dorothy Shurtleft	Episode: "Dorothy Shurtleft"
1991	Mom P.I.	Celine	Episode: "Night Train"
1992	The Broken Cord	Ruby Stiges	Television film
1993	The Hidden Room	Sandra	Episode: "Jillie"
1993–1997	Kung Fu: The Legend Continues	Det. Mary Margaret Skalany	31 episodes
1994	Thicker Than Blood: The Larry McLinden Story	Claudia	Television film
1994	Catwalk	Amy Doulon	Episode: "Getting What You Want"
1995	The Hardy Boys	Joyce	Episode: "The Debt Collectors"
1997	The Newsroom	Heather Campbell	Episode: "Meltdown: Part 3"
1997	When Secrets Kill	Phyllis Hodges	Television film
1997	On the 2nd Day of Christmas	Mindy	Television film
1997	Riverdale	Melissa	Television film
1998	Real Kids, Real Adventures	Lagaythe	Episode: "Plane Crash on Christmas Day"
1998	Thanks of a Grateful Nation	Marcia Timmerman	Television film
1998	Traders	Donna	Episode: "Blood on the Floor"
1999	Total Recall 2070	Surgeon	3 episodes
1999	Cruel Justice	Fay Joiner	Television film
1999	The Famous Jett Jackson	Sheila / Director	2 episodes
1999	Black and Blue	Sheila Walsh	Television film
1999	If You Believe	Dorinda	Television film
2000	Anne of Green Gables: The Continuing Story	Margaret Bush	Miniseries
2001	The Familiar Stranger	Claire	Television film
2001	Lucky Girl	Judy	Television film
2001	Blind Terror	Peggy	Television film
2001	Largo Winch	Dr. Carol Turner	Episode: "Arctic Project"
2001–2008	Paradise Falls	Frances Hunter	68 episodes
2002, 2003	Odyssey 5	Jenny Taggart	2 episodes
2003	Open House	Marie	Television film
2003	Blue Murder	S.I.S. Janet Myers	2 episodes
2003	Jasper, Texas	Nancy Nicholson	Television film
2003	Queer as Folk	Alexa Scott	Episode: "One Ring to Rule Them All"
2003	The Piano Man's Daughter	Older Woman	Television film
2004	This Is Wonderland	Janice Pells	Episode #1.9
2004	Open Heart	Marjorie Bain	Television film
2005	Tilt	Eddie's Mother	3 episodes
2005	Our Fathers	Sacha Pfeiffer	Television film
2005	Jesse Stone: Stone Cold	Margaret Pennington	Television film
2005	Waking Up Wally: The Walter Gretzky Story	Phyllis Gretzky	Television film
2008	True Confessions of a Hollywood Starlet	Gaby	Television film
2009	Warehouse 13	Jesslyn Henjik	Episode: "Resonance"
2009	Flashpoint	Janet Ackerman	Episode: "Coming to You Live"
2009–2010	Cra$h & Burn	Detective Dee Dee White	6 episodes
2011	Republic of Doyle	Siobhan McDonagh	Episode: "Sympathy for the Devil"
2011	Haven	Lucy Ripley	Episode: "Business as Usual"
2013	Prosecuting Casey Anthony	Dr. Jan Garavaglia	Television film
2013	Jack	Nancy Layton	Television film
2013	Beauty & the Beast	Law Partner	Episode: "Who Am I?"
2016	Slasher	Sonja Edwards	3 episodes
2016	A Puppy for Christmas	Helen	Television film
2016	Incorporated	Carol Granger	Episode: "Vertical Mobility"
2017, 2018	Taken	Sarah Mills	2 episodes
2019	Heartland	Doreen Vernon	2 episodes
2019	Christmas in Montana	Kay	Television film
2019, 2020	In the Dark	Kathy	2 episodes
2020	Nurses	Barb Gelson	Episode: "Chrysalis"
