= If You Were the Last =

2023 American film

- Release poster
- Directed by: Kristian Mercado
- Written by: Angela Bourassa
- Produced by: Andrew Miano; Dan Balgoyen; Britta Rowings; Dennis Masel; Gabrielle Nadig; Jessamine Burgum; Kara Durrett; Jon Levin; Sean Woods
- Starring: Anthony Mackie; Zoë Chao
- Cinematography: Alex Disenhof
- Edited by: Henry Hayes
- Music by: Christopher Bear
- Production companies: Depth of Field; Pinky Promise; Storm City Films
- Distributed by: Peacock
- Release dates: March 14, 2023 (SXSW); October 20, 2023 (United States)
- Running time: 93 minutes
- Country: United States
- Language: English

If You Were the Last is a 2023 American science fiction romantic comedy film directed by Kristian Mercado and written by Angela Bourassa. The film stars Anthony Mackie and Zoë Chao.

The film centers around two astronauts who, while stranded on a multi-year exploration mission, fall in love with each other.

It premiered at the 2023 South by Southwest Film & TV Festival, and was released to the Peacock streaming service on October 20, 2023.

== Plot ==
In a living room playing chess, Adam and Jane debate if NASA would spend billions to save one astronaut stranded on Mars. Although talking about The Martian, Adam then asks if this would be true in real life. We then see Saturn directly outside their window. Jane concedes that Benson might share Adam's optimism, but he points out that she went crazy, and we see another astronaut's remains nearby.

The astronauts' routine in their third year in space includes joint exercise, then daily tasks. Jane has spacecraft maintenance, attempts to reestablish comms and navigation. Botanist Adam looks after their plants, chickens and a goat. They play chess, watch films and listen to music to make their days bearable.

After a regular cardio dance routine, Jane chides Adam for masturbating in the greenhouse. He then proposes they have sex. Jane laughs, and Adam insists it would be a stress reliever devoid of romantic feelings. She lists two of three reasons why not to have sex: ‘No Attraction’ and ‘Both Married’.

Adam and Jane watch Alien against his wishes, as they have not watched it yet. Spooked, he later crawls into her bunk. Half asleep, Jane forgets she is unclothed so wakes naked, pressed up against Adam. Shortly, she suggests cuddling could be positive for their mental health. Jane then mentions the third reason not to have sex: ‘Space Babies’. As all three astronauts left spouses stateside, NASA had not included condoms. When Adam suggests she might be sterile from radiation exposure, she leaves, disgusted.

Jane and Adam rant about each other to the inanimate Benson. She confesses she adapted four power drills into dildos, admits she has considered sex with him and is sure he finds her attractive. Adam believes Jane's reasons against it are ridiculous as they will not be rescued.

Both watch their spouses' video messages, Adam hoping that his aspiring politician wife Savannah has not waited for him and Jane knowing her sedentary Tom would have loved being there. Adam prevents her meltdown when she loses her music. They do more and more together. Jane makes Adam homemade pop tarts once Adam's run out. When the goat dies, although they lose fresh milk, they gain 50 meals.

The day after agreeing to do 'everything but' sexually, they regain navigational control. Calculating their return will take three weeks, they abandon their resolve and have sex frequently. Talking about what they most miss, for Jane, it is exploring and music, and for Adam, it’s his wife's hugs. When he wishes she remain his best friend, she does not agree.

At a press conference on Earth, the disoriented astronauts are asked about Benson, Jane says she died in her sleep, although a flashback shows Jane having to axe her to save Adam when she went crazy. Suddenly Savannah appears, kisses him and leads him out. Both astronauts must undergo a barrage of tests. Tom shows, confessing he had dated, but nothing serious. Savannah threw herself into politics, first as mayor and now governor.

In their debriefings, Adam talks about his experiments crossing blueberries with marijuana. Jane tells them about Benson turning violent and demonstrates the adapted drills. As their respective spouses are completing their discharge papers, Jane and Adam say their goodbyes. He asks to stay in contact, but she refuses.

Back in Savannah's world, Adam feels invisible. He has kept the shuttle chickens, which stay in their house and bother her. As Jane and Tom chat in bed, she admits dancing with Adam was her favorite part of being in space. Initially when Jane suggests a trip, Tom resists, but relents upon remembering she had been closed in for years.

On a run, when Jane hears a certain song, her feelings for Adam come flooding back. So at home, when she discovers Tom had been regularly seeing Amber, she insists he contact her, then confesses her and Adam's sexual relationship. At the White House dinner nine days after their return, Jane tells Adam and Savannah she split with Tom. The President insists the astronauts show their dancing skills. Savannah sees their chemistry, subsequently Adam and she split.

Adam goes to Jane, declaring they are meant for each other, and subsequently take a trip away together.

== Cast ==
- Anthony Mackie as Adam Gherrity
- Zoë Chao as Jane Kuang
- Natalie Morales as Savannah Gherrity
- Geoff Stults as Tom Wright
- Missi Pyle as Megan Benson

== Reception ==
On the review aggregator website Rotten Tomatoes, 88% of 26 critics' reviews are positive. The website's consensus reads: "The charmingly lo-fi If You Were the Last relies on the chemistry of its starring duo to fuel its emotionally driven sci-fi story." Metacritic, which uses a weighted average, assigned the film a score of 70 out of 100, based on six critics, indicating "generally favorable" reviews.
