= Zoë Chao =

American actress and screenwriter

- Born: Zoë Carroll Chao; September 19, 1985 (age 41); Providence, Rhode Island, U.S.
- Education: Brown University (BA); University of California, San Diego (MFA)
- Occupations: Actress; screenwriter

Zoë Carroll Chao (born September 19, 1985) is an American television and stage actress and screenwriter, principally known for her roles as Isobel in Strangers and Zoë in The Afterparty.

== Early life ==
Chao was born in Providence, Rhode Island, United States. Her mother has Irish and English ancestry, while her father is of Chinese descent. Her paternal grandmother immigrated from China to Michigan. Chao has stated that she grew up in a family of visual artists. After graduating from the Wheeler School in 2004, she received her BA in art history from Brown University and her MFA from the graduate acting program at UCSD.

== Career ==
Chao has participated in theatre productions, including La Jolla Playhouse's Sideways, Surf Report, and WoW Festivals' Our Town, and Ensemble Theatre Company's Amadeus. In 2016, she appeared in the Off Broadway play Friend Art at Second Stage. She has worked with directors Christopher Guest, Les Waters, Ping Chong and Chris Ashley.

Chao also starred in her own TV series, God Particles, which she wrote and produced. She co-produced the 2017 short Like Animals. She is perhaps best known for starring as Isobel in Strangers, the first three episodes of which were screened at the Sundance Film Festival.

In 2022-23, Chao was in the main cast of the Apple TV+ mystery comedy series The Afterparty. In 2024, Chao appeared as Nina Mazursky in the animated television series Creature Commandos, written and created by James Gunn for the DC Universe based on the team of the same name.

In April 2024, it was announced that Chao was cast in the comedy Let's Have Kids!, opposite Karen Gillan; written by Adam Sztykiel, making his directorial debut, the announcement included plans to film sometime that year.

== Personal life ==
During the filming of Strangers, Chao relocated from New York City to Los Angeles.

== Filmography ==
Key
†	Denotes films that have not yet been released

=== Film ===
Year	Title	Role	Notes
2006	My Girlfriend's Abroad		
2014	The Gordon Game	Wife	Short
2015	Dirty Beautiful	Jamie	
2015	Dirty Garden		Short
2015	Center Pedal	Y	Short
2017	Like Animals	Mary	Short
2019	Where'd You Go, Bernadette	Soo-Lin	
2019	Almost Love	Haley	
2020	Downhill	Rosie	
2020	The High Note	Katie	
2020	I Used to Go Here	Laura	
2021	Long Weekend	Vienna	
2022	Family Squares	Kelly	
2022	Senior Year	Tiffany Blanchette	
2023	Your Place or Mine	Minka	
2023	Somebody I Used to Know	Ramona	
2023	If You Were the Last	Jane Kuang	
2024	Nightbitch	Jen	
2025	The Roses	Sally	
2026	Let's Have Kids!	Phoebe	

=== Television ===
Year	Title	Role	Notes
2011	The Protector	BAO House Girl	Episode: "Beef"
2012	Hart of Dixie	Dr. Lee	Episode: "Disaster Drills & Departures"
2014	God Particles	Rue	4 episodes
2014	The Comeback	Shayna	4 episodes
2015	Nicky, Ricky, Dicky & Dawn	Ms. Nakamura	Episode: "Sweet Foot Rides"
2015	Monster Girls	Halfoff	TV short
2016	Rizzoli & Isles	Mimi Tanaka	Episode: "A Shot in the Dark"
2016	That's What She Said		TV miniseries
2017–18	Strangers	Isobel	Main role
2018	Succession	Joyce Miller's Staff	Episode: "Sad Sack Wasp Trap"
2019	The OA	Mo	2 episodes
2019	Living with Yourself	Kaylyn	Recurring role
2020–21	Love Life	Sara Yang	Main role (season 1); Guest role (season 2)
2021	Modern Love	Zoe	Episode: "The Night Girl Finds a Day Boy"
2022–23	The Afterparty	Zoë Zhu	Main role
2023	Celebrity Jeopardy!	Herself	Contestant
2023	Party Down	Lucy Dang	Main role (season 3)
2024–25	Creature Commandos	Nina Mazursky (voice)	Main role (season 1)

== Awards and nominations ==
Year	Award	Category	Work	Result
2015	International Academy of Web Television Awards	Best Female Performance in a Comedy	God Particles	Won
2023	Critics Choice Association Celebration of Asian Pacific Cinema & Television	Actress Award for Television	The Afterparty	Won
2024	Variety's 10 Actors to Watch			Honored
