= Dark Web: Cicada 3301 =

2021 film directed by Alan Ritchson

- Film poster
- Directed by: Alan Ritchson
- Written by: Alan Ritchson; Joshua Montcalm
- Produced by: Alan Ritchson; DJ Viola; Carl Beyer; Mark Bach
- Starring: Jack Kesy; Conor Leslie; Ron Funches; Kris Holden-Ried; Andreas Apergis; Alan Ritchson
- Cinematography: Michael Galbraith
- Edited by: Marc Bach
- Music by: Sergei Stern
- Production company: AllyCat Entertainment
- Distributed by: Lionsgate Films
- Release date: March 12, 2021
- Running time: 104 minutes
- Country: United States
- Language: English

Dark Web: Cicada 3301 is a 2021 American action-comedy thriller film directed by Alan Ritchson, in his directorial debut, who co-wrote the screenplay with Joshua Montcalm. Inspired by the eponymous organization, it stars Jack Kesy, Conor Leslie, Ron Funches, and Ritchson. Kesy portrays a hacker who participates in Cicada's recruitment game while evading the NSA.

The film was released digitally by Lionsgate Films on March 12, 2021.

== Plot ==
Arrested by the NSA for his involvement with the secretive organization Cicada 3301, hacker Connor testifies in front of the United States Foreign Intelligence Surveillance Court about the events that transpired. Connor explains that 29 days earlier, he inadvertently found the organization's recruitment game, which requires participants to solve a series of puzzles in order to join. Strong-armed by the NSA to help them shut down Cicada, Connor takes part in the game alongside Gwen, a librarian seeking to be recruited, and his best friend Avi. The three succeed in finding clues from the puzzles, but after nearly being killed by another group of participants, Gwen and Avi drop out. Connor continues the game and eventually causes a massive power outage, earning him an invitation to Cicada's private party in England.

Recognizing Cicada intends to bring chaos to the world, Connor informs Gwen and Avi of his plans to stop the organization at the party, prompting them to join him. The infiltration goes awry, resulting in Connor and Gwen being captured by Cicada's leader, Phillip Dubois. Dubois, who defends the organization as bringing equality to an unjust world, reveals Gwen is a treasonous NSA agent pursuing amnesty through Cicada. Connor and Gwen are ordered to shoot the other with an antique pistol in order to join Cicada, but Connor instead kills Dubois' guards. Gwen is shot and provides Connor with a USB drive to obtain the information Cicada holds. Confronted by Connor, Dubois confesses he is an actor following orders from Cicada and was unaware anyone would be harmed. As the NSA storms the building, Connor succeeds in downloading the information before being knocked unconscious in his escape attempt, while the agents kill Dubois.

At the conclusion of Connor's testimony, the judges find fault in the NSA's tactics, but also inform Connor he has incriminated himself in several felonies. However, Connor reveals he was stalling the court with his testimony in order to start leaking the private documents he downloaded. Connor threatens to continue leaking information unless he receives $1 million for each document and Avi is released from custody. His extortion successful, Connor uses his new finances to assist others. He receives a message from Gwen, who is now a member of Cicada.

== Cast ==
- Jack Kesy as Connor
  - Tomaso Sanelli as young Connor
- Conor Leslie as Gwen
- Ron Funches as Avi
- Alan Ritchson as Agent Carver
- Andreas Apergis as Agent Sullivan
- Kris Holden-Ried as Phillip Dubois

Featured on the film's United States Foreign Intelligence Surveillance Court are Victoria Snow as Judge Mary Collins, Marvin Karon as Judge Bates, and Rothaford Gray as Judge Walters. In Connor's apartment, Alyssa Cheatham portrays young tenant Sophia, Quancetia Hamilton portrays Sophia's mother, and Anselmo DeSousa portrays landlord Mr. Costa. Tori, a waitress at Connor's bar, is played by Linnea Currie-Roberts. Al Sapienza plays NSA Agent Mike Croft and Benjamin Sutherland appears as William, a bar patron who gets hacked by Connor.

At Avi's college, Ron Mustafaa plays a library clerk and Zane O'Connor plays a security guard. Jess Salgueiro portrays Shauna, a young woman who encounters Avi at the Cicada party. Jake Michaels and Hanneke Talbot, who appeared on the series Titans alongside Leslie, Ritchson, and Sanelli, portray the lookout for the NSA team and a hologram of an Ancient Greek woman, respectively. Michael T. Burgess appears as one of the deer-masked assailants participating in the recruitment game. Connor's father is portrayed by Patrick Garrow.

== Production ==
Dark Web: Cicada 3301 was announced in 2018 as the first original project of Phreaker Films, a film fund run by Alan Ritchson. The fund was established through a partnership between Ritchson's AllyCat Entertainment and Marina Acton, a Silicon Valley–based venture capitalist. Originally entitled Cicada 3301, it is inspired by the eponymous organization that posted a set of puzzles to recruit codebreakers from the public on three occasions.

The film is the directorial debut of Ritchson, who also co-wrote the screenplay with Joshua Montcalm and appears in a supporting role as an NSA agent. Ritchson wrote the original screenplay by himself, but contacted Montcalm for re-writes due to being dissatisfied with it. After writing the script, Ritchson intended to play the lead role until he decided to become the director.

Filming began in June 2018 in Toronto. Dark Web: Cicada 3301 features Ritchson alongside Conor Leslie, who both appeared on the superhero television series Titans, although the two had not worked together prior to the film.

== Release ==
The rights to Dark Web: Cicada 3301 were acquired by Lionsgate Films in 2020, who released the film digitally on March 12, 2021. Home media releases were distributed by Lionsgate on March 16, 2021.

== Reception ==
Film Threat reviewer Alan Ng gave the film a positive review, describing it as "a pretty cool action thriller". While disliking that it did not offer a serious depiction of the Cicada 3301 phenomenon, Ng praised the action sequences and the performances. The film received three stars out of five from Brian Costello of Common Sense Media, who called it "an action-comedy that somehow manages to be engaging despite all the clichés" and "enjoyable enough for a lazy weekend afternoon".

Giving the film a C−, Josh Bell of Crooked Marquee found the material "incoherent" and criticized the humor as "vulgar". Similar criticisms were shared by Joel Copling of Spectrum Culture, who concluded that Dark Web: Cicada 3301 "is mostly interested in overwhelming us with a lot of plot that is impossible to follow and characters who are impossible to like".

Farid-ul-Haq of The Geekiary recommended the film for its characters, themes, and humor, although he found that the narrative could have been expanded. Android Police reviewer Cody Toombs called the film "a great ride with plenty of laughs, intrigue, action, and most importantly, characters", commenting that he wanted the project as "a TV series rather than a standalone film, or at least it should lead to some sequels" to see more of the characters played by Jack Kesy, Conor Leslie, and Ron Funches.
