= Quancetia Hamilton =

Canadian actress

Quancetia Hamilton is a Canadian actress of African-Caribbean heritage. She is most noted for her performance as Agent Nelson in the television series Call Me Fitz, for which she was a Canadian Screen Award nominee for Best Supporting Actress in a Comedy Series at the 2nd Canadian Screen Awards in 2014.

She has acted most prominently on stage, including in both the 2003 Theatre Passe Muraille and 2005 Princess of Wales Theatre productions of Da Kink in My Hair.

== Filmography ==
=== Film ===
Year	Title	Role	Notes
1996	Bogus	Meter Maid	
1998	Down in the Delta	Gina	
1999	Have Mercy	Sandy	
2001	Exit Wounds	Housewife	
2001	On Their Knees	Quancetia Walker	
2001	Who Is Cletis Tout?	Receptionist	
2002	American Psycho 2	Neighbour	
2002	You Stupid Man	Gospel Singer	
2004	Touch of Pink	Airplane Woman	
2004	A Home at the End of the World	Dancing Party Guest	
2005	Fever Pitch	Rita	
2005	Get Rich or Die Tryin'	Canary Waitress	
2006	Take the Lead	Parent	
2007	Charlie Bartlett	Mrs. Albertson	
2007	Mr. Magorium's Wonder Emporium	Gia, with a Squid on Her Head	
2008	Flash of Genius	Case Worker	
2008	Saw V	Person with Dog	
2011	In a Family Way	Nurse	
2014	Guidance	Denise Crain	Voice
2018	Little Italy	Cha'Relle	
2018	Elliot the Littlest Reindeer	Vixen	Voice
2021	Dark Web: Cicada 3301	Sophia's Mom	

=== Television ===
Year	Title	Role	Notes
1995–1996	Side Effects	Nurse / Nurse #2	3 episodes
1996, 1998	Due South	Trustee #2 / Basement Clerk	2 episodes
1997	Ready or Not	Nurse	Episode: "Hello, Goodbye"
2000	The Sons of Mistletoe	Sales Clerk	Television film
2000	On Hostile Ground	Mrs. Smiley	Television film
2000	Who Killed Atlanta's Children?	Willie Mae Mathis	Television film
2000	Custody of the Heart	Nurse's Aide	Television film
2000	Livin' for Love: The Natalie Cole Story	Drue	Television film
2001	Soul Food	Cashier	Episode: "Nice Work If You Can Get It"
2001	Bojangles	Hattie McDaniel	Television film
2001	Sex, Lies & Obsession	Woman #2	Television film
2001	Witchblade	Gina Maris	Episode: "Conundrum"
2001	The Feast of All Saints	Elsa, Lola's Servant	Television film
2002	Monk	2nd Dispatcher	Episode: "Mr. Monk Meets Dale the Whale"
2002	Chasing Cain II: Face	Desiree	Television film
2003	Deacons for Defense	Woman	Television film
2003	Fallen Angel	Roadside Crewperson	Television film
2004	Wonderfalls	Minister	Episode: "Lying Pig"
2004	Evel Knievel	Nurse Trish	Television film
2004	A Very Married Christmas	Woman 1	Television film
2005	Tilt	Tammi	Episode: "The Game"
2006	Doomstown	Twist's Mother	Television film
2007	Life with Derek	Nurse	Episode: "Not So Sweet Sixteen"
2009	Da Kink in My Hair	Suspect Client	Episode: "Pardnah Me?"
2009	Cra$h & Burn	Choir Singer #1	Episode: "Sunday, Bloody Sunday"
2010	The Kids in the Hall: Death Comes to Town	40-Year-Old Black Woman	Episode: "The Butterfly Is to Blame"
2010	The Front	Aide	Television film
2011	Skins	Female Screener	Episode: "Abbud"
2012	Call Me Fitz	Agent Nelson	Episode: "Thirty Percent Less Pulp Fiction"
2013	Suits	Big Bertha	Episode: "The Other Time"
2014	Dad Drives	Receptionist	Episode: "TV Pilot"
2015	Remedy	Gloria Rand	Episode: "Life in Technicolour"
2015	Riftworld Chronicles	Mrs. Gonzalez	8 episodes
2017	The Beaverton	Phyllis Langdon	Episode #1.10
2019	The Umbrella Academy	Griddy's Employee	Episode: "The Day That Wasn't"
2019	Carter	Patron	Episode: "Harley Takes a Bow"
