= Dirty Beautiful =

- Film poster
- Directed by: Tim Bartell
- Written by: Tim Bartell
- Produced by: Tim Bartell; Joe Brouillette; Justin Hogan; Cameron McIntyre
- Starring: Ricky Mabe; Jordan Monaghan; Conor Leslie; Zoë Chao; Stu James; Darin Heames
- Cinematography: Adam Lee
- Edited by: Blake Barrie; Daniel Riam
- Music by: Mike Sawitzke; Roy Shakked
- Production companies: Doggie Dream Productions; Trulight Pictures
- Distributed by: Indie Rights
- Release date: February 28, 2015 (Cinequest)
- Running time: 95 minutes
- Country: United States
- Language: English
- Budget: $47,398

Dirty Beautiful is a 2015 romantic comedy-drama film written and directed by Tim Bartell. Starring Ricky Mabe and Jordan Monaghan, it depicts the relationship between a struggling writer (Mabe) and a troubled young woman (Monaghan). The film premiered at the Cinequest Film Festival on February 28, 2015, and was distributed by Indie Rights.

== Plot ==
Film buff David moves to Los Angeles to become a screenwriter, but struggles to complete his scripts and is relegated to working as a storyboard artist. He forms a friendship with fellow writer Nicole through workshops, only for their friendship to abruptly end when he makes a romantic pass at her. David's life changes when a young woman named Kat forces herself into his car. After Kat reveals that she is homeless, David reluctantly allows her to live with him.

Despite her erratic behavior and troubled past, David finds himself drawn to Kat and they start to become intimate. Kat informs David she came to Los Angeles from Idaho with a man she loved, but he abandoned her and she resorted to prostitution to survive. The two nearly separate when Kat arranges to start working for a pimp named Armstrong, but David, unable to abandon her, ensures she returns to his apartment.

David and Kat grow closer, culminating with Kat becoming pregnant. However, Kat refuses to change her lifestyle and continues to consume alcoholic beverages. Recognizing that they are not prepared to raise a child, David convinces Kat to get an abortion. Shortly afterwards, Kat destroys David's screenplay notes. A heated argument between the couple ensues and Kat leaves David to return to Idaho.

With Kat gone, David finally gains the inspiration to complete his first script about their time together and resumes his friendship with Nicole. After David remarks that his life is better without Kat, Kat calls him to reveal she has returned to Los Angeles. David initially refuses to take Kat back to his apartment, but eventually relents and allows Kat to live with him again.

== Cast ==
- Ricky Mabe as David
- Jordan Monaghan as Kat
- Conor Leslie as Nicole
- Darin Heames as Armstrong
- Zoë Chao as Jamie
- Stu James as Marcus

== Production ==
Originally entitled Dave & Kat, Dirty Beautiful is Tim Bartell's first feature film. According to Bartell, the film was inspired by an incident when a young homeless woman hitched a ride with him and suggested coming back to his home, but Bartell declined. With Dirty Beautiful, Bartell said he sought to explore what would happen if someone like him took the young woman home.

Production on the film began in 2012. Within the year, Ricky Mabe and Jordan Monaghan were cast the leads. Bartell raised $26,428 for the project, with additional funding provided through a Kickstarter campaign raising $20,730 and an Indiegogo campaign raising $240 for a $47,398 total.

== Release ==
Dirty Beautiful premiered at the Cinequest Film Festival 2015 on February 28, 2015, and was screened at other festivals during 2015 and 2016. The film won 48 awards in 67 film festivals. It was released through digital distribution and streaming services iTunes, Google Play, YouTube, Amazon Prime Video, and Vudu.
