= Pressure Point (2001 film) =

2001 film by Eric Weston

- Film poster
- Directed by: Eric Weston
- Screenplay by: William Lee
- Story by: Richard O. Lowry
- Produced by: Richard O. Lowry
- Starring: Michael Madsen; Victoria Snow; Ricky Mabe; Samantha E. Cutler; Jeff Wincott
- Cinematography: Francois Archambault
- Edited by: Robert E. Newton
- Music by: Daniel Scott
- Production companies: Frontline Entertainment Group; Steven Finly Productions
- Distributed by: Velocity Pictures
- Release dates: August 2001 (Italy); May 28, 2002 (USA)
- Running time: 90 min.
- Country: Canada

Pressure Point, titled Pris au piège in French, is a 2001 Canadian suspense thriller film starring Michael Madsen and Jeff Wincott. Directed by Eric Weston, the film was distributed direct-to-video and was the first release for Velocity Home Entertainment, a subsidiary of ThinkFilm. The film also features Ricky Mabe.

== Plot ==
A fugitive killer takes over a vacationing family's motor home and assumes the father's identity. The real father must fight to convince the sheriff that he is not a murderer while protecting his family.

== Cast ==
- Michael Madsen as Jed Griffen
- Victoria Snow as Haley Griffen
- Ricky Mabe as Shane Griffen
- Samantha E. Cutler as Tiffany Griffen
- Jeff Wincott as Rudy Wicker
