= Titans season 1 =

2018 season of American TV series

Titans
- Season 1
- Promotional poster
- Showrunner: Greg Walker
- Starring: Brenton Thwaites; Anna Diop; Teagan Croft; Ryan Potter
- No. of episodes: 11

Release
- Original network: DC Universe
- Original release: October 12 – December 21, 2018

Season chronology
- Next → Season 2

The first season of the American superhero streaming television series Titans premiered on DC Universe on October 12, 2018, and concluded on December 21, consisting of 11 episodes. It was executive produced by Akiva Goldsman, Geoff Johns, Greg Berlanti, Sarah Schechter, and Greg Walker, with Walker serving as showrunner. Created by Goldsman, Johns, and Berlanti, the series is based on the DC Comics team Teen Titans. Featured in the main cast are Brenton Thwaites, Anna Diop, Teagan Croft, and Ryan Potter. The season also introduces Alan Ritchson, Minka Kelly, Curran Walters, and Conor Leslie, who would join the main cast in the following season. The first season marks the live-action debut of the Teen Titans, as well as the launch of DC Universe's original scripted programming.

In the first season, vigilante Dick Grayson (Thwaites) leaves Gotham City for Detroit in an effort to distance himself from his mentor Bruce Wayne. When the mysterious Rachel Roth (Croft) comes to Dick for protection from dangerous forces pursuing her, Dick finds himself thrust into action as he struggles to distance himself from his Robin persona and control his violent urges. Joined by Kory Anders (Diop), an amnesiac woman with solar-based powers, and Gar Logan (Potter), an animal shapeshifter, the four battle a threat that puts the entire world at risk.

Development of a live-action series based on Teen Titans began in 2014 when the project was picked up by TNT. A pilot written by Goldsman and Marc Haimes was ordered, but never filmed, and TNT passed on the project in 2016. The following year, Warner Bros. announced that the project would move forward in 2018 as the first scripted series for DC Universe. Initially planned to comprise 12 episodes, the original finale would be removed and the intended penultimate episode became the season finale. The season's story was primarily inspired by Marv Wolfman and George Pérez's The New Teen Titans comics from the 1980s.

The season received generally positive reviews, with praise for the story, characters, and performances. Criticism was directed towards the violent tone and the finale's cliffhanger ending. The second season, which was announced ahead of the first season's premiere, would use the original finale as the basis for its premiere episode.

In addition to being the first live-action adaptation of the Teen Titans, the season serves as the live-action introduction for the DC Comics team Doom Patrol, who appear in the self-titled fourth episode. The characters introduced would later be featured in an eponymous series on DC Universe, with April Bowlby, Matt Bomer, and Brendan Fraser reprising their roles as Rita Farr, Larry Trainor, and Cliff Steele, although it occupies a separate continuity from Titans.

== Episodes ==
No. overall	No. in season	Title	Directed by	Written by	Original release date	Prod. code
1	1	"Titans"	Brad Anderson	Story by : Akiva Goldsman & Geoff Johns & Greg Berlanti; Teleplay by : Akiva Goldsman & Geoff Johns	October 12, 2018	T15.10146
Following her mother Melissa's murder at the hands of a mysterious assailant, troubled teen Rachel Roth exhibits telekinetic powers and flees town. Detroit police detective Dick Grayson fights crime at night using his vigilante persona, Robin. Rachel is picked up by Detroit police, recognizes Dick from her nightmares, and asks him for help. By the time he realizes that she was telling the truth about her mother, Rachel has been drugged and abducted. Meanwhile, in Vienna, Austria, Kory Anders awakens in a bullet-ridden car wreck with no memory of her identity. She finds her way to gangster Konstantin Kovar, whom she has apparently betrayed in her search for a certain girl—Rachel. When Kovar attempts to shoot her, she releases a fiery power that incinerates him and everyone else in the room. About to be ritually slain by the man who killed her mother, Rachel blacks out as a dark version of herself emerges and kills her would-be murderer. Dick arrives, and takes her off to safety. In Covington, Ohio, a green tiger is seen on the prowl in an electronics store at night. Later, this tiger escapes the store and transforms into a green haired human boy with a stolen video game.
2	2	"Hawk and Dove"	Brad Anderson	Akiva Goldsman	October 19, 2018	T13.20902
After calling in a favor from Alfred Pennyworth, Dick takes Rachel to Hank Hall and Dawn Granger, masked vigilantes known as Hawk and Dove, with whom Dick fought crime years earlier. Though Hank and Dawn are in a committed relationship, Rachel senses that Dick and Dawn were previously involved, and still have unresolved issues. When a jealous Hank fights with Dick, Rachel's dark self manifests to stop it. The Nuclear Family is "activated" to retrieve Rachel, and they torture Dick's new partner, Detective Amy Rohrbach, to find him. Hawk and Dove take down an arms dealer with Robin's brutal assistance. Rachel is upset to discover that Dick intended to abandon her with Hank and Dawn. The Nuclear Family easily defeats Dick, Hank, and Dawn, on the roof of the building. The episode ends with Dawn critically injured, and Rachel captured.
3	3	"Origins"	Kevin Rodney Sullivan	Richard Hatem & Geoff Johns and Marisha Mukerjee & Greg Walker	October 26, 2018	T13.20904
Kory tracks down Rachel, and watches the Nuclear Family abduct her. Rachel's dark self refuses to help her, but Kory arrives, incinerates Nuclear Dad with her powers, and convinces Rachel to leave with her. Rachel and Kory find their way to a convent where Melissa had supposedly hidden from Rachel's father when she was a baby, and which Kory had visited in search of Rachel a year before. Dick recalls learning that his parents' death was not an accident, and being taken in by billionaire Bruce Wayne, who offers to teach Dick "another way to deal with the pain". Rachel meets Garfield Logan briefly, and Dick arrives. After Rachel's dark self manifests again, Dick and Kory take her back to the convent, where the sisters secretly lock her in the basement. Kory discovers that before her memory loss she was researching various doomsday prophecies concerning the advent of an apocalyptic "raven". Rachel's dark self taunts her and then manifests, leading to an explosion that allows Rachel to flee.
4	4	"Doom Patrol"	John Fawcett	Geoff Johns	November 2, 2018	T13.20905
In a flashback, a full-costumed man comes across an ill Gar and injects him with something to save his life. Back in the present, Rachel comes across Gar, in his tiger form, as she flees through the woods. After an encounter with hunters, Gar takes Rachel to his house where she meets Cliff Steele, Larry Trainor, and Rita Farr. Dr. Niles Caulder is angry at Gar for bringing a stranger into their home and then apologizes for being stern with him. Though he is interested in running tests on Rachel moments after saving the life of Shyleen Lao. She agrees, but then demands to be unstrapped from the table. Niles refuses and shoots Gar with a tranquilizer dart when he tries to intervene. Rachel's dark self emerges and attacks Niles. Meanwhile, Dick and Kory find the convent in ruins, and track Rachel to the Caulder house. Dick calms Rachel down and promises he will protect her. He departs with Rachel and Kory, and Gar goes with them, encouraged by Cliff to live his own life. The next day, Caulder is back in his wheelchair looking out the window.
5	5	"Together"	Meera Menon	Bryan Edward Hill & Gabrielle Stanton	November 9, 2018	T13.20906
Dick makes the alliance with Kory, Gar, and Rachel official, and they all demonstrate their powers. Rachel and Gar connect, and Dick and Kory have sex. Dr. Adamson sends a new Nuclear Stepdad to the family. The Nuclear Family attacks, but together the group is able to subdue them. Dick also reveals himself as Robin to the group. Dick visits Adamson, who kills the family via a remote detonator. When a strike team comes to kill Dick, the new Robin appears and saves him.
6	6	"Jason Todd"	Carol Banker	Richard Hatem & Jeffrey David Thomas	November 16, 2018	T13.20907
Dick and Jason Todd, the new Robin, take Adamson to one of Bruce's safe houses in Chicago, where they are later joined by Kory, Rachel, and Gar. Learning that Bruce implanted a tracker in his arm at some point in the past, Dick removes it with a scalpel. Jason tells Dick that someone is murdering everyone who worked with his parents at the circus. Dick seeks out Clayton Williams, the only performer still alive and the likely next target. Clayton is abducted by Nick Zucco, son of Tony Zucco, the mobster who killed the Graysons. Nick wants revenge against Dick, who he blames for the Maronis' murder of his entire family and his disfigurement. Jason helps Dick neutralize Nick, but Dick is disturbed by his needless brutality when he attacked the local police officers. Meanwhile, Adamson tells Kory that he will only talk to Rachel.
7	7	"Asylum"	Alex Kalymnios	Bryan Edward Hill & Greg Walker	November 23, 2018	T13.20908
Adamson slashes his own throat to force Rachel to use her empathic powers to revive him. He then informs Dick and Kory that Rachel will "purify" the world. Adamson tells them about Angela Azarath, Rachel's birth mother, who is being held at an abandoned asylum. They are captured when they arrive at the asylum, and Dick, Kory, and Gar are subjected to torturous examinations. Adamson promises to end their suffering if Rachel calls to her father, but Rachel kills Adamson instead. Rachel finds Angela, showing her birthmark to prove she is actually Angela's daughter. Taking Angela with her, Rachel frees the others, although Gar is traumatized by having killed an asylum doctor. They escape, Kory burns the asylum down, and Dick burns his Robin suit.
8	8	"Donna Troy"	David Frazee	Richard Hatem & Marisha Mukerjee	November 30, 2018	T13.20909
While Rachel, Kory, and Gar accompany Angela by train to the house she owns in Ohio, Dick goes off on his own to reconnect with an old friend named Donna Troy. The FBI stops the train in search of Kory, but she and the others escape after she causes a train car to explode. Afterwards, they make their way to Killdeer, Ohio. While Rachel uses her powers to unlock Kory's memories, Donna translates text that Dick photographed in Kory's storage unit. Donna's interpretation of the lost ancient language is that Kory's mission is to kill Rachel. Kory has a flash of memory and grabs Rachel by the throat.
9	9	"Hank and Dawn"	Akiva Goldsman	Geoff Johns	December 7, 2018	T13.20910
With Dawn still in a coma, Hank remembers his childhood when he was manipulated and sexually abused by his football coach Vincent, who also threatened to molest his little brother Don. In college, Hank and Don become vigilantes Hawk and Dove to punish sex offenders. An unconscious Dawn remembers her life as a ballerina and the last time she saw her mother, arguing over her returning to an abusive ex. Dawn's mother and Don are killed in the same accident and Dawn and Hank get to know each other in grief counseling. Dawn discovers Hank's past as Hawk. He tells Dawn about the abuse, but admits that he never sought retribution against Vincent because he could not face what happened to him. Dawn finds Vincent and demands that he confess. When they have beaten each other brutally, Hank arrives and finishes off Vincent. Hank and Dawn sleep together. In the present, Dawn awakens from her coma and tells Hank they need to find Jason Todd and help Rachel.
10	10	"Koriand'r"	Maja Vrvilo	Gabrielle Stanton	December 14, 2018	T13.20911
Donna and Dick arrive at the house in Killdeer Ohio in time to stop Kory from killing Rachel. Once revived, a remorseful but confused Kory leaves on her own to investigate a new memory of an abandoned warehouse, and is followed at a distance by Donna and Dick. They all reunite at this warehouse destination, where they find a hidden spaceship that uncloaks itself for Kory. They all board, where Kori discloses that she is Koriand'r, on a mission to destroy Rachel before she brings about the destruction of Earth, as well as her home planet Tamaran. Rachel's father is Trigon, a being from another dimension who devours worlds. Rachel is both Trigon's doorway back to our dimension and a means to destroy him. Dick, Donna, and Kory realize that Angela is still assisting Trigon. Back at the house, Angela is met with Thomas Carson, the Sheriff of Killdeer. Thomas is investigating unusual reports following the incident on the train, and he recognized Angela from when they grew up together. He leaves, then returns in the evening hoping to start a relationship with Angela. Around the same time, Gar begins seeing apparitions in Angela's house, then collapses in pain. This is possibly from ingesting soup Angela prepared earlier. Thomas hears Gar's pain and unsuccessfully tries to call for help. Outside of the view of Gar and Rachel, Angela kills Thomas, stating that she is currently still in a relationship, which confirms the earlier suspicions about Angela. With Gar dying, Angela convinces Rachel to call Trigon to help her. She does, and Trigon and Angela are reunited. Trigon heals Gar and tells Angela that they can begin destroying the world once Rachel's heart breaks. Dick, Donna, and Kory arrive back at the house, but only Dick manages to pass through the mystical barrier that now surrounds Angela's house.
11	11	"Dick Grayson"	Glen Winter	Richard Hatem	December 21, 2018	T13.20912
Five years in the future, Dick is living happily with Dawn and their son John, with another baby on the way. Rachel and Gar are at college. A paraplegic Jason asks Dick to stop Batman who is intent on killing Joker. It was mentioned that Alfred is dead, Commissioner James Gordon was killed by Joker, Barbara Gordon went missing, and Batman has not spoken to Superman in years. Dick travels to Gotham and is reunited with Kory, who has joined the FBI. Batman murders Joker as well as every patient and staff member at Arkham Asylum including Riddler (who was responsible for crippling Jason), Two-Face and the Ventriloquist. Dick feels compelled to reveal Batman's secret identity to the police so they can apprehend him. Kory and a SWAT team raid Wayne Manor, but Batman slaughters them all. An enraged Dick demolishes the mansion with explosives. When he finds Batman alive but trapped in the rubble, Dick kills him by stepping on his neck. In the present, Rachel is horrified to see Dick enslaved by Trigon's power and the dark future and Dick's murder of Batman is revealed to have been a fantasy created by Trigon to lead Dick to embrace darkness. In a post-credits scene, a man designated as "Subject 13" and bearing a Superman logo tattoo escapes containment in a Project Cadmus facility located somewhere in Metropolis. He also frees a Labrador Retriever, whose eyes glow red.

== Cast and characters ==
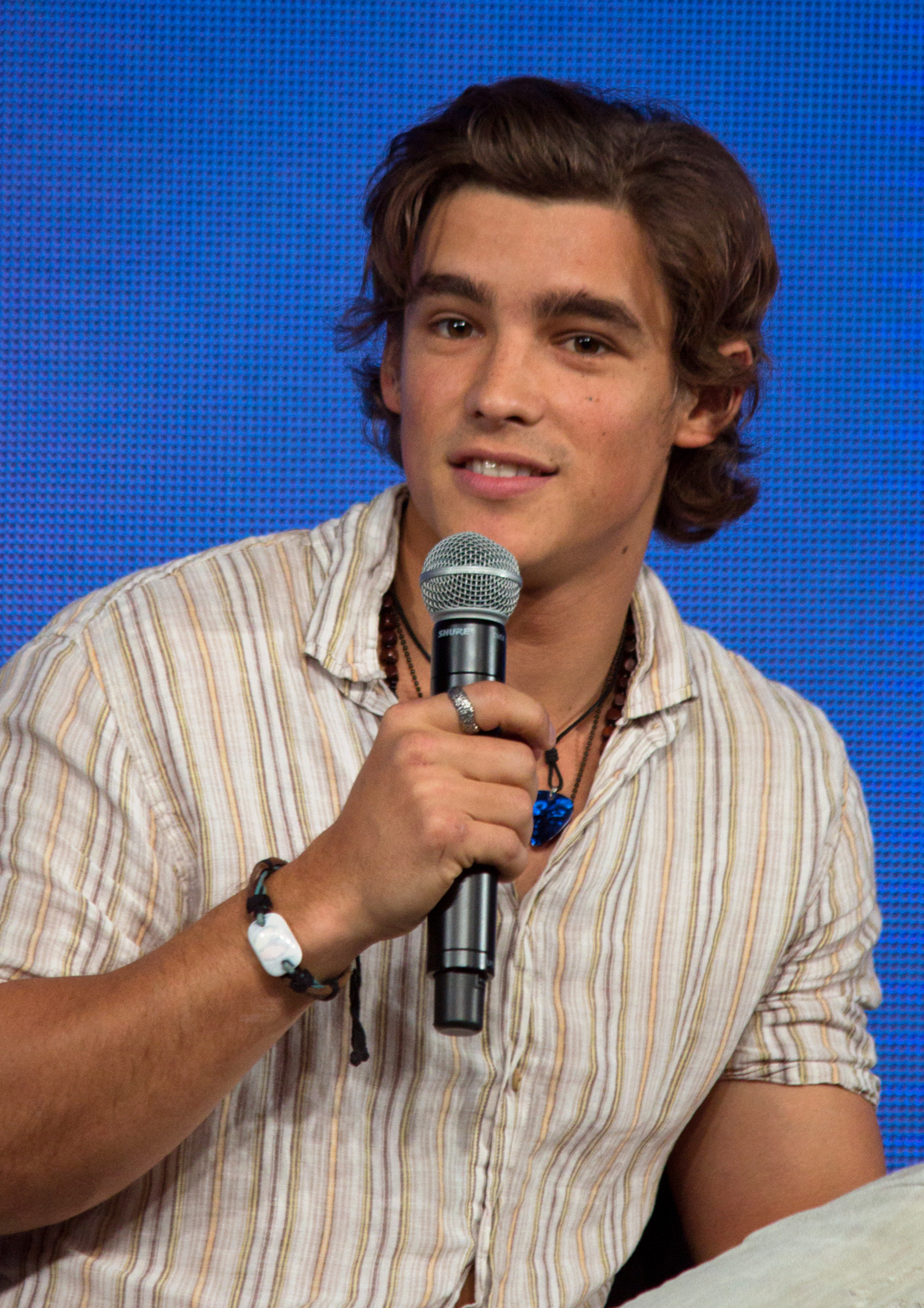
Brenton Thwaites stars as Dick Grayson.

=== Main ===
- Brenton Thwaites as Dick Grayson / Robin: The former vigilante sidekick of Batman, now a police detective estranged from his mentor
  - Tomaso Sanelli as young Dick Grayson
- Anna Diop as Koriand'r / Kory Anders: An amnesiac extraterrestrial from the planet Tamaran with the ability to absorb and redirect solar energy
- Teagan Croft as Rachel Roth: An empath born to a demon father and human mother
- Ryan Potter as Gar Logan: A shapeshifter formerly with the Doom Patrol who developed the ability to transform into a tiger

=== Recurring ===
- Reed Birney as Dr. Adamson: A high-ranking member of Trigon's organization
- Alan Ritchson as Hank Hall / Hawk: The aggressive half of a vigilante duo with his girlfriend Dawn, formerly partnered with his half-brother Don
  - Tait Blum as young Hank Hall
- Minka Kelly as Dawn Granger / Dove: A vigilante who serves as a tactical counterpart to her partner and boyfriend Hank
- Curran Walters as Jason Todd / Robin: Batman's current vigilante sidekick, taking on the role of Robin after Dick's departure
- Rachel Nichols as Angela Azarath: Rachel's biological mother, secretly in allegiance with Trigon
- Melody Johnson as Nuclear Mom: The matriarch of the Nuclear Family
- Jeni Ross as Nuclear Sis: The daughter/sister figure of the Nuclear Family
- Logan Thompson as Nuclear Biff: The son/brother figure of the Nuclear Family

=== Guest ===
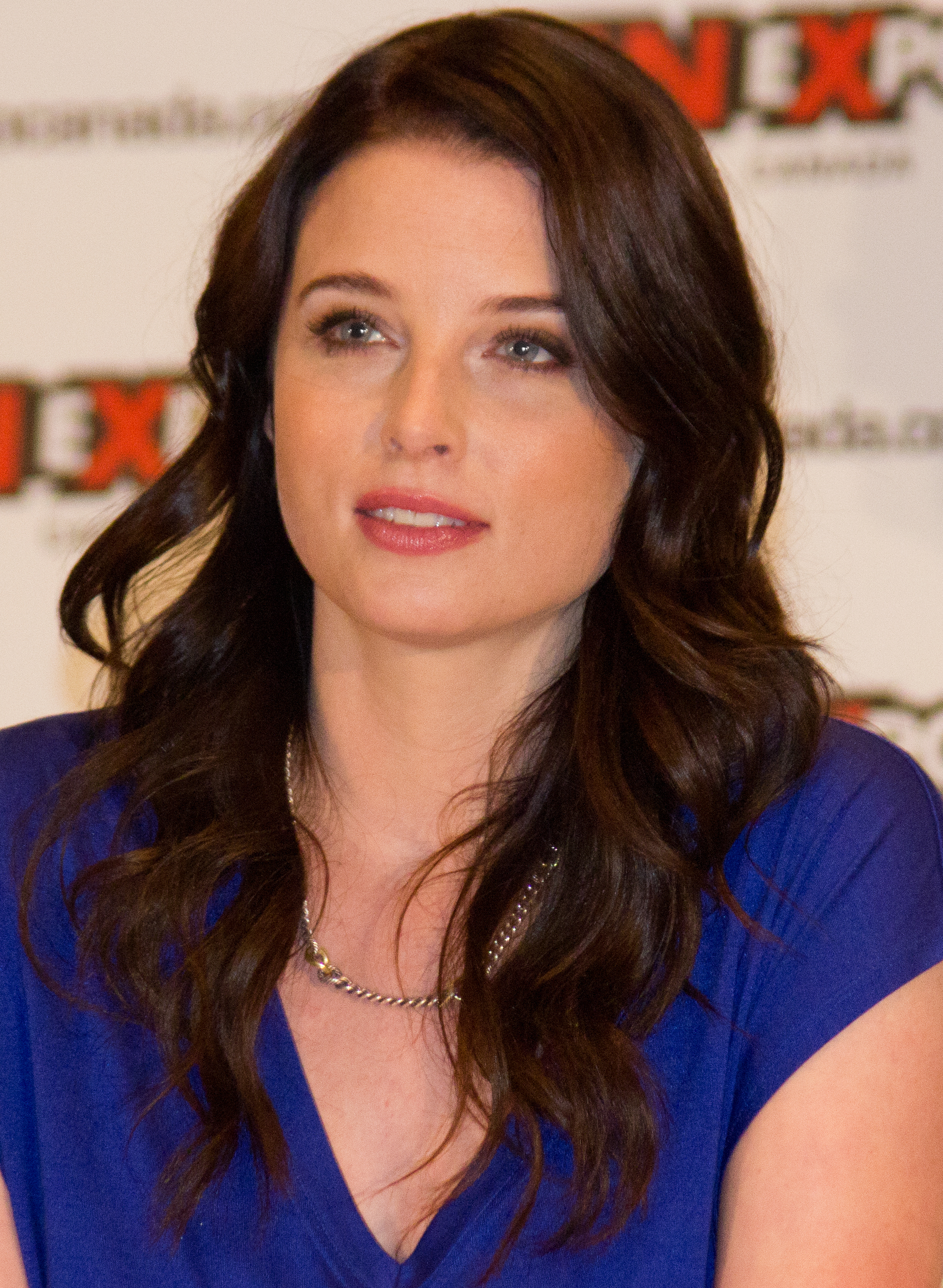
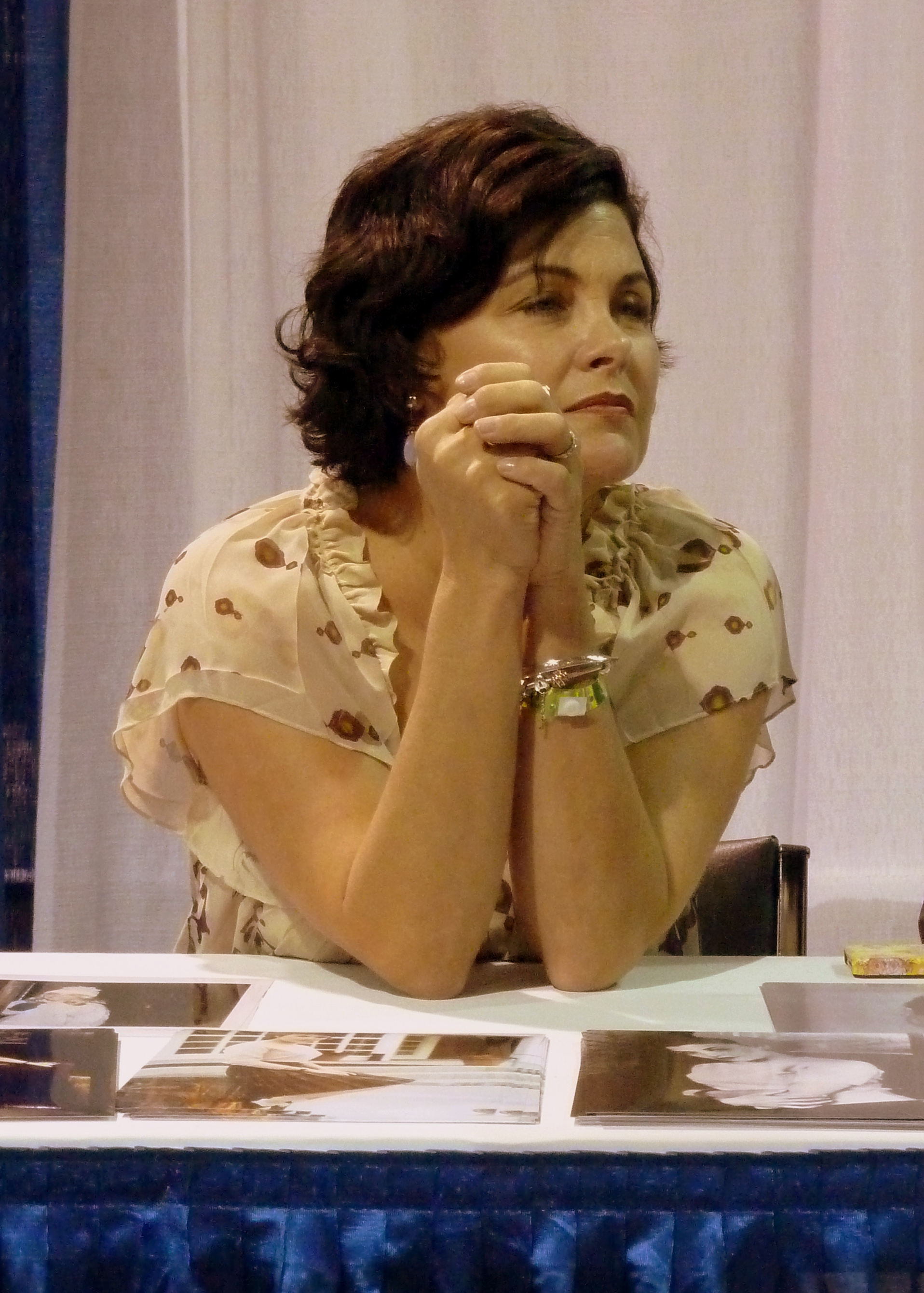
The comic character Arella was split into the roles played by Rachel Nichols and Sherilyn Fenn (top to bottom).
- Lindsey Gort as Amy Rohrbach: A Detroit police detective partnered with Dick Grayson
- Conor Leslie as Donna Troy: An adopted member of the Amazons who was Wonder Woman's sidekick Wonder Girl before pursuing a career as an investigative photojournalist
  - Andi Hubick as young Donna Troy
- Seamus Dever as Trigon: An interdimensional demon with the power to destroy worlds and Rachel's father. Dever also portrays Frank Finney, a Gotham City police captain in an illusion created by Trigon.
- Jarreth Merz as the Acolyte: A mysterious man hunting Rachel
- Liza Colón-Zayas as Jessica Perez: A detective in the Detroit Police Department
- Sherilyn Fenn as Melissa Roth: Rachel's adoptive mother
- Meagen Fay as Sister Catherine: The head of a convent that Rachel resided in as a child
- Cara Ricketts as Becky Bond: A social worker who managed Bruce's adoption of Dick
- April Bowlby as Rita Farr: A member of the Doom Patrol and former actress, whose cellular structure became unstable after being exposed to a toxic gas
- Bruno Bichir as Niles Caulder / The Chief: The leader of the Doom Patrol and medical scientist, responsible for saving the lives of its members and giving them residence in his mansion
- Jake Michaels and Brendan Fraser as Clifford "Cliff" Steele: A member of the Doom Patrol and former stock car racer, whose brain was transplanted into a robotic body after an accident destroyed his own. Michaels physically portrays Cliff while Fraser voices the character and appears as him in photos.
- Dwain Murphy and Matt Bomer as Larry Trainor: A member of the Doom Patrol and former United States Air Force pilot wrapped entirely in bandages after being exposed to negative energy. Murphy physically portrays Larry while Bomer provides the voice of the character and appears as him in photos.
- Hina Adbullah as Shyleen Lao: A young woman who develops the ability to control temperature from being covered in liquid nitrogen
- Lester Speight as Clayton Williams: A nightclub security guard who was previously a strongman at Haly's Circus and Dick's caretaker before Bruce adopted Dick
- Kyle Mac as Nick Zucco: Tony Zucco's vengeful son
- Rachael Crawford as the asylum doctor: The head of Agnews Asylum
- Elliot Knight as Don Hall / Dove: Hank's original partner and younger half-brother
  - Jayden Marine as young Don Hall
- Marina Sirtis as Marie Granger: Dawn's mother
- Trevor Hayes as Vincent: A child molester who was Hank's football coach
- Jeff Roop as Thomas Carson: Angela's former high school classmate, now the sheriff of their hometown
- Randolf Hobbs and April Brown Chodkowski as John and Mary Grayson: A pair of trapeze artists at Haly's Circus and Dick's parents
- Mark Antony Krupa as Konstantin Kovar: A gangster in Vienna, Austria
- Jeff Clarke as Nuclear Dad: The patriarch of the Nuclear Family
- Zach Smadu as Nuclear Stepdad: Nuclear Dad's successor in the Nuclear Family
- Richard Zeppieri as Tony Zucco: The gangster responsible for the deaths of Dick's parents
- Damian Walshe-Howling as Graham Norris: An international poacher and contact of Donna
- James Scallion as Johnny "John" Grayson: Dick and Dawn's son in an illusion created by Trigon

Body double Brooker Muir portrays Subject 13 in a post-credit scene. Stuntmen Alain Moussi and Maxime Savaria make uncredited appearances as Batman, while an uncredited actor portrays the character's alter-ego Bruce Wayne. An uncredited actor provides the voice of Alfred Pennyworth. Maisie Williams and Rory McCann appear in archive footage from the Game of Thrones episode "First of His Name" as Arya Stark and Sandor Clegane.

== Production ==
=== Development ===
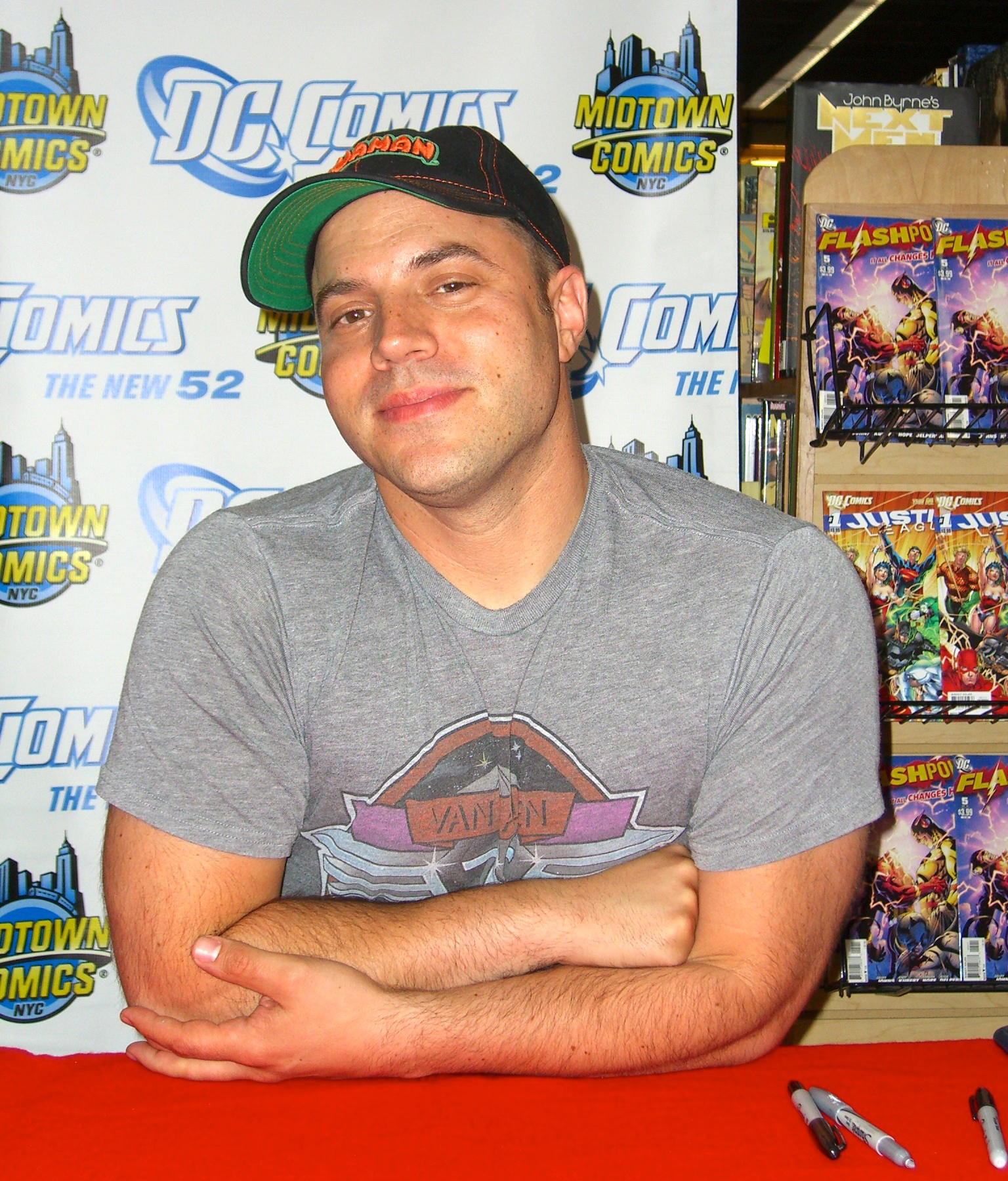
Co-creator Geoff Johns previously wrote the Teen Titans comic relaunch in 2003.

A potential live-action Titans project for cable channel TNT was announced in September 2014. By December, a pilot written by Akiva Goldsman and Marc Haimes was ordered that would feature Dick Grayson emerging from Batman's shadow to become Nightwing, the leader of a band of heroes including Starfire, Raven, Oracle, and Hawk and Dove. The pilot was set with filming to occur in Toronto in the mid-2015. In May 2015, TNT president Kevin Reilly said that they hoped to have the casting locked down by the start of filming and that the show would be "very true" to the comics and "groundbreaking". The series, called Titans and then Blackbirds, was first set to begin shooting in Toronto in mid-2015. Production was then postponed to October. In January 2016, TNT was no longer moving forward with the project. Geoff Johns later commented that he and DC knew about TNT nixing Titans for months.

In April 2017, Warner Bros. announced the series Titans to debut in 2018 on DC Comics' own direct-to-consumer digital service. The series was created by Goldsman, Johns, and Greg Berlanti, who wrote the pilot episode. Showrunner duties were given to Greg Walker. Goldsman, Johns, Berlanti, Walker, and Sarah Schechter are also executive producers of the series through Goldsman's Weed Road Pictures and Berlanti's Berlanti Productions, in association with Warner Bros. Television.

Though 12 episodes were initially announced, the 12th episode was removed and the 11th episode became the season 1 finale. The intended 12th episode served as the basis for the season 2 premiere.

=== Writing ===
Johns said that the series was inspired mostly by the Teen Titans comics of the 1980s, since that comic's run "had so much drama" and "was so revolutionary for its time". He added: "We really wanted to lean into the idea that every Titan of these Titans is a doorway into another genre. With Rachel [a.k.a. Raven], it's the supernatural and the horror, and the first season really focuses on who Raven is and how the Titans galvanize around her". Johns also felt the series would be "a little more adult" than the television series Riverdale, calling it "not necessarily a teen drama, but more of an adventure piece". Regarding the show's tone, Johns said that they "wanted to do something different from everything else out there. We wanted to arrive at a tone that wasn't as welcoming as some of the DC shows have been, nor as nihilistic as some of the films have been". Goldsman said that as the series continues, it will ask "How are these broken people going to cohere? Or will they?" Johns noted that Robin's controversial "Fuck Batman" line in the pilot was a late addition to the script. Dick's actor Brenton Thwaites said of the line: "I thought it was perfect ... This is not a show about Batman. It's a show about Dick".

=== Casting ===
The main cast was rounded up between August and October 2017. Teagan Croft was cast as Rachel Roth, followed by Anna Diop as Kory Anders, Brenton Thwaites as Dick Grayson and Ryan Potter as Gar Logan. Ahead of the series premiere, Diop reduced her presence on social media because of racist attacks towards her casting.

Other casting additions were included during 2017 and 2018. Alan Ritchson and Minka Kelly were cast in the recurring roles of Hank Hall and Dawn Granger, respectively. Lindsey Gort was cast as original character Amy Rohrbach, while Seamus Dever was cast as Trigon. Members of the Doom Patrol are portrayed by Bruno Bichir as the Chief, April Bowlby as Rita Farr, Jake Michaels as Cliff Steel, and Dwain Murphy as Larry Trainor. Elliot Knight was cast as Don Hall, while Curran Walters and Conor Leslie appear as Jason Todd and Donna Troy, respectively.

=== Filming ===
Filming for the first season began on November 15, 2017, in Toronto, Ontario, and concluded on June 28, 2018.

== Reception ==
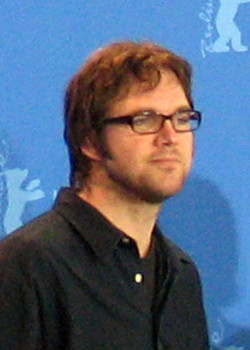
Although reception to the first two episodes (director Brad Anderson pictured) was mostly positive, the violent content drew criticism.

On Rotten Tomatoes, the first season holds an approval rating of 78%, with an average rating of 6.66 out of 10 based on 46 reviews. The site's critical consensus states: "Despite a few tonal growing pains, Titans does justice to its source material and truly shines when its titular ensemble finally assembles". Metacritic gave the series's first season a score of 55 out of 100 based on eight critics.

Susana Polo of Polygon praised Titans for "tempering brutal violence and dark subject matter with humor—and by giving its characters plenty of time to stretch, breathe and become attached to one another". Describing Anna Diop's performance of Kory Anders as the strongest aspect of the first three episodes, Charlie Ridgely of Comicbook.com wrote that "she conveys so much wonder and intrigue with her subtle and genuine expressions, but there is a consistent fierceness and tenacity that is always lurking just beneath the surface". Rosie Knight of Nerdist wrote that the "cast is at the core of what makes Titans so enjoyable", while also praising the scriptwriting.

Forbes contributor Merrill Barr compared the show to The CW's Riverdale, describing it as "a dark and gritty series very far removed from the image the Teen Titans have garnered through a variety of animated outings over the last decade". Barr found that viewers "that take the tone in stride are going to find themselves in the middle of a series dialed directly into their interests". Rob Salkowitz of Forbes wrote that Titans "somehow managed to deliver on the dark-and-foreboding tone that the early DC movies so conspicuously got wrong".

Kevin Yeoman of Screen Rant was critical of the show's excessive violence, writing that Titans "doesn't put forward any new or particularly compelling thoughts about its characters or about superheroes in general". Similarly, Vinne Mancuso of Collider said: "If you're just a fan of some good old-fashioned ultra-violence and moody storytelling, this simply isn't a well-done example of that".

Evening Standard reviewer Guy Pewsey stated that the series was "enjoyable and watchable" and although questioned whether Brenton Thwaites could "pull off the role of leader of a group of crime-fighters" as Dick Grayson; he called Diop's performance a "highlight" of Titans.

The season finale "Dick Grayson", which was originally intended as the penultimate episode, drew criticism for its cliffhanger ending and not resolving the main storyline of the season. IGN's Jesse Schedeen gave the finale four out of ten, writing that after "Titans got off to a surprisingly good start this year, especially considering all the baggage the series was carrying when it first debuted", the episode "manages to derail that momentum and goodwill with a head-scratching and extremely unsatisfying final chapter". Den of Geek's Mike Cecchini called the episode's cliffhanger "anticlimactic and feels like a cheat". Writing for Entertainment Weekly, Christian Holub said: "The journey to Nightwing is gonna take a lot longer than I thought. But I was really impressed by this season overall, and I'm excited for season 2".
