= Jack Kesy =

American actor

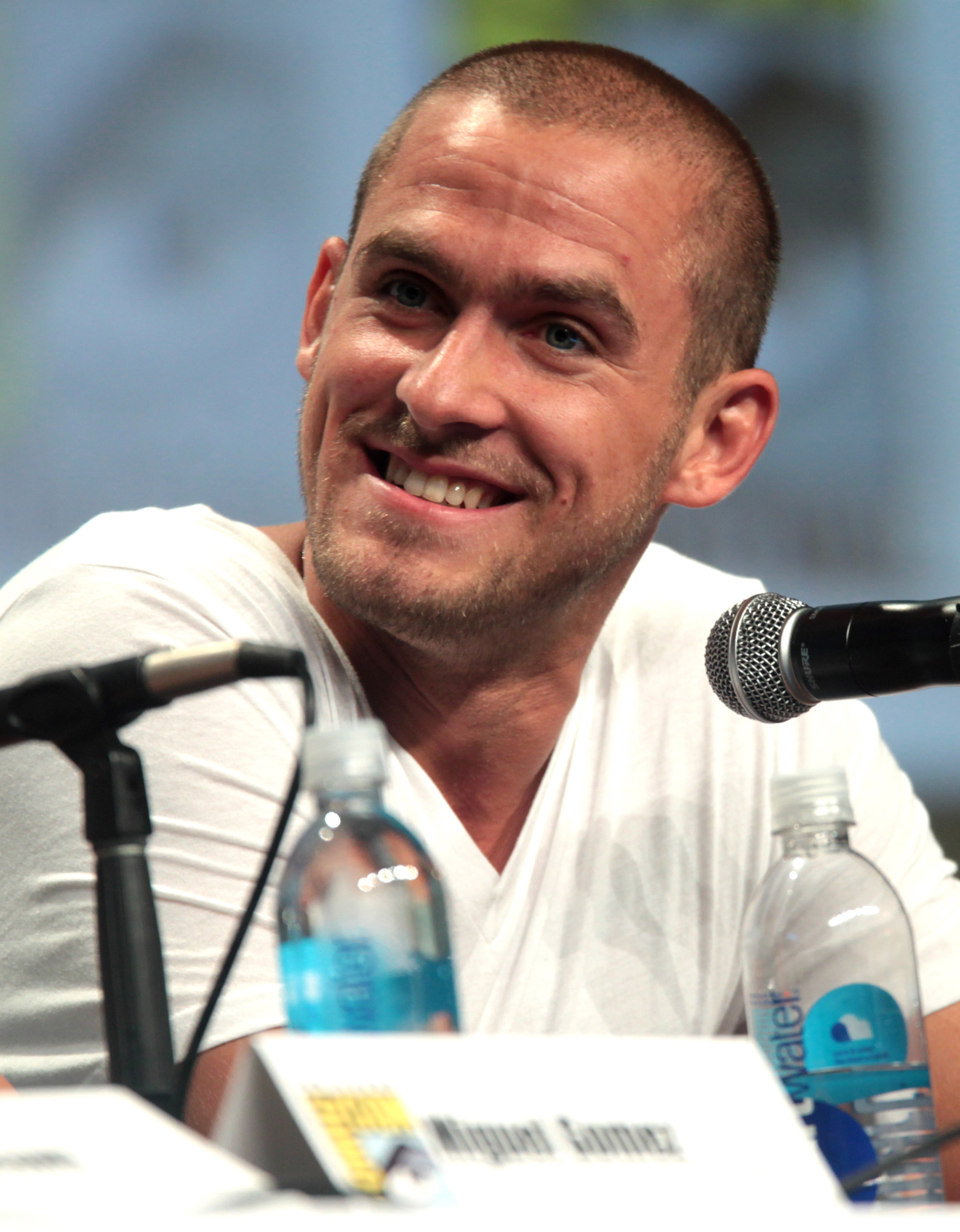
- Kesy in 2014
- Born: New York City, U.S.
- Occupation: Actor
- Years active: 2009–present

Jack Kesy (/ˈkɛsi/) is an American actor. On television, he has portrayed Gabriel Bolivar on the FX horror drama The Strain (2014–2016) and Roller Husser on the TNT dark comedy Claws (2017–19). He also played Black Tom Cassidy in the Marvel Comics film Deadpool 2 (2018) and played Anung un Rama/Hellboy in the superhero horror film Hellboy: The Crooked Man (2024), being the third actor to portray the character after Ron Perlman and David Harbour.

== Early life and education ==
Kesy studied acting in London at the Guildhall School of Music & Drama.

== Filmography ==
Key
†	Denotes films that have not yet been released

=== Film ===
Year	Title	Role	Notes	Ref.
2009	Emina	Zoran	Video short	
2011	Yelling to the Sky	N/A	Uncredited role	
2011	8:46	Tommy		
2012	Morgan	Dean Kagen		
2012	Recruiter	Methhead Alan		
2013	Empire Gypsy	Ivan		
2014	Grand Street	Sal		
2015	The Throwaways	Connelly		
2015	Intruders	J.P. Henson		
2015	Tomato Soup	Ellington		
2017	Hot Summer Nights	'Ponytail'		
2017	Baywatch	Leon		
2017	Juggernaut	Saxon Gamble		
2018	12 Strong	Charles Jones		
2018	Death Wish	Tate 'The Fish' Karp		
2018	Deadpool 2	Black Tom Cassidy		
2018	Blood Brother	Jake Banning		
2020	The Outpost	Sergeant Josh Kirk		
2020	Mosquito State	Beau Harris		
2021	Dark Web: Cicada 3301	Connor		
2021	Without Remorse	Thunder		
2023	Sheroes	Jasper		
2023	The Killer	Salesman		
2024	Hellboy: The Crooked Man	Hellboy		
2025	Bang	William Bang		
2025	The Pickup	Banner		
2026	The Isolate Thief	William "Red" Baker		
TBA	The Gun on Second Street †	TBA		

=== Television ===
Year	Title	Role	Notes
2014–2016	The Strain	Gabriel Bolivar / The Master	Main role (seasons 1–2); recurring role (season 3)
2016	Ray Donovan	Butch	Episode: "Lake Hollywood"
2017–2019	Claws	Roller Husser	Main role (seasons 1–3)
2018	The Alienist	Henry Wolff	Episode: "The Boy on the Bridge"
2020	Deputy	Roman Burgin	Episode: "10-8 Outlaws"
2025	Task	Billy Prendergrast	2 episodes
2026	12 12 12	Bobby Galvin	Upcoming series
