= Alan Ritchson =

American actor (born 1982)

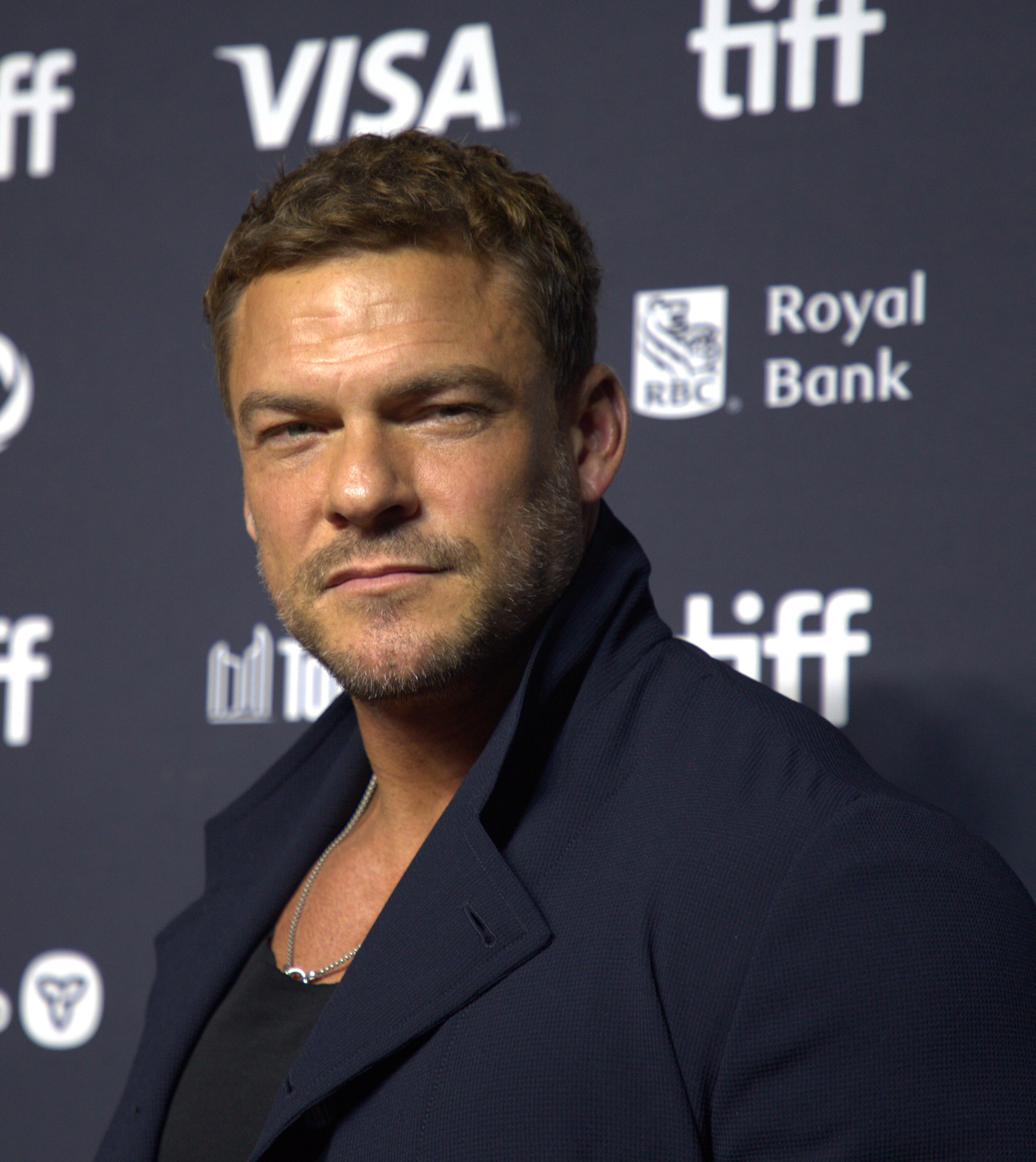
- Ritchson in 2025
- Born: Alan Michael Ritchson; November 28, 1982 (age 43) (Note: Though some sources state he was born in 1984, this might be because Ritchson's age was given as 20 when he auditioned for American Idol's third season in early 2004. But the show was filmed several months prior, with auditions being held in August and September 2003. Ritchson states he was 39 years old in a February 2022 interview with Michael Rosenbaum, he graduated in 2001, and several sources confirm the November 28, 1982, birth date.); Grand Forks, North Dakota, U.S.
- Education: Okaloosa Walton Community College (AA)
- Occupations: Actor; film director; screenwriter; producer; singer
- Years active: 2004–present
- Spouse: Catherine Ritchson (m. 2006; sep. 2026)
- Children: 3

Alan Michael Ritchson (born November 28, 1982) is an American actor. He made his acting debut as Arthur Curry / Aquaman on The CW superhero series Smallville (2005–10), where he appeared as a guest star between the fifth and tenth seasons. He subsequently had a starring role in the Spike TV sitcom Blue Mountain State (2010–2011), a role he reprised in the 2016 film sequel. He also headlined the SyFy action series Blood Drive (2017), and returned to superhero television as Hank Hall / Hawk on the DC Universe/HBO Max series Titans from 2018 to 2021.

He gained wider recognition for portraying the title character in the Amazon Prime Video action thriller series Reacher, beginning in 2022. His latest film appearance is War Machine (2026), where he plays an Army Ranger candidate fighting an extraterrestrial killing machine.

Outside television, Ritchson played Raphael in the 2014 Teenage Mutant Ninja Turtles reboot and its 2016 sequel, along with appearances in The Hunger Games: Catching Fire (2013), Lazer Team (2015), and Fast X (2023). He made his directorial debut and co-starred in the action-comedy Dark Web: Cicada 3301 (2021).

He also launched and owned a production company Dancing Skeleton.

== Early life and education ==
Ritchson was born on November 28, 1982, in Grand Forks, North Dakota. He is the son of Vickie Ritchson, a high school teacher, and David Ritchson, a retired U.S. Air Force chief master sergeant. He has one older brother and one younger brother, and was raised Catholic. The family moved around for his father's work. When he was two, his family moved from Guam to Rantoul, Illinois. When he was 10, Ritchson's father was transferred to Eglin Air Force Base and the family lived in nearby Niceville, Florida. At Niceville High School, Ritchson became interested in performing; he performed in school musicals and regarded Jim Carrey as his idol. In 1999, while still in high school, he began taking college-level music theater and dance classes at Okaloosa Walton Community College, now Northwest Florida State College in Niceville. He graduated from Niceville High in 2001.

After graduating from high school, he received a full scholarship to study music and theater at Okaloosa Walton, where he was a member of the Fine Arts Division's Soundsations and Madrigal Singers. However, Ritchson dropped out after two years "because [he] didn't feel fulfilled".

He worked at a gas station for a short time before signing with Next Management in Miami Beach, Florida, to work as a model for a few years.

== Career ==
=== Modeling ===
During his modeling career, Ritchson was an underwear and runway model. He also worked with Bruce Weber, a photographer for the Abercrombie & Fitch catalogue.

=== Television ===
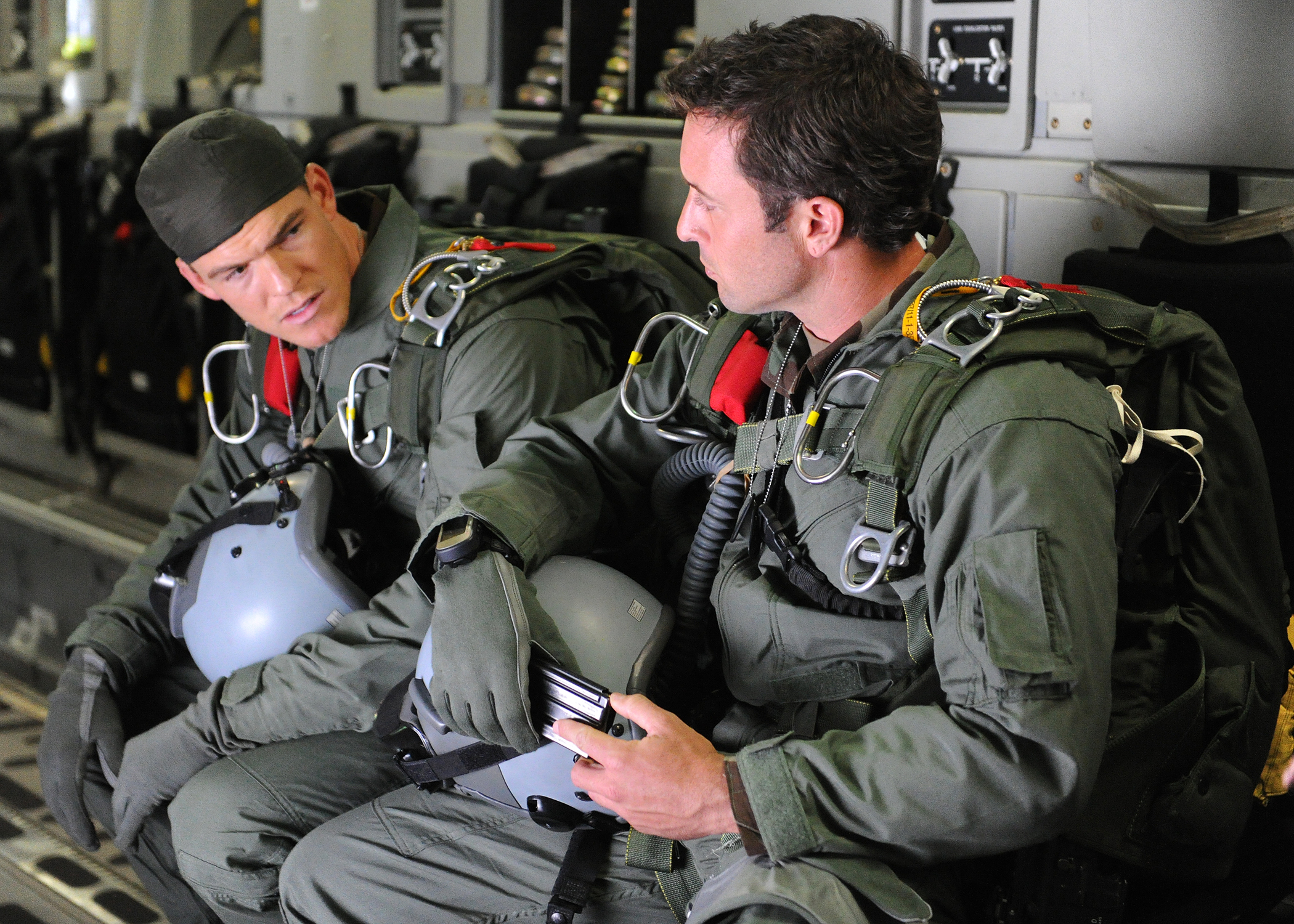
Ritchson (left) with Alex O'Loughlin filming on location for the television series Hawaii Five-0, 2013

Ritchson gained celebrity status in 2004 when he appeared on American Idol as one of the top 87 contestants in the third season before being cut during the Hollywood round. His appearance on the show was noted for his striptease in one episode in which he charmed judge Paula Abdul during his audition. He decided to stay in Los Angeles and pursue an acting career.

His television acting credits include a recurring guest star role on the television series Smallville as superhero Arthur Curry / Aquaman. His role in Smallville marked the first time Aquaman was portrayed by an actor in an officially licensed live-action production. His future Smallville co-star, Justin Hartley, later portrayed Aquaman in an unaired pilot of the same name before joining the cast of Smallville as another character. Ritchson reprised his role as Aquaman in the final season.

Ritchson had a starring role as an army officer in the Hallmark Channel movie Though None Go with Me (2006) alongside Cheryl Ladd, and the role of Lucian Manet in the Lifetime film Nora Roberts' Midnight Bayou (2009). In 2009, he appeared on a third-season episode of Starz's Head Case in which he played a stripper. Ritchson also appeared on CSI: Miami, in which he played a dead victim in episode 19 of season 8. In 2011, he appeared in an episode of season 3 of 90210 as a love interest for main character Teddy Montgomery (Trevor Donovan).

In 2010, he started playing the main role of Thad Castle, the captain of a college football team, in Spike TV's Blue Mountain State. He stayed on the show until it was cancelled after its third season in February 2012. He also appeared in several television shows, including Hawaii Five-0. In 2015, Ritchson became a regular on the NBC variety show I Can Do That (based on the Israeli variety show) alongside Nicole Scherzinger, Ciara, Joe Jonas, Cheryl Burke and Jeff Dye, and hosted by Marlon Wayans. In 2016, he appeared in "Nosedive", an episode of the anthology series Black Mirror.

In 2017, he played the main character in the Syfy series Blood Drive. In 2018, Ritchson played the recurring role of Hank Hall / Hawk in the DC Universe series Titans. His initial deal was for just two episodes but he was promoted to a series regular for the second season. Producers decided to reduce the number of characters and Ritchson was written out of the series.

In 2020, it was announced that Ritchson would play the role of Jack Reacher in an eponymous series on Amazon Prime.

=== Films ===
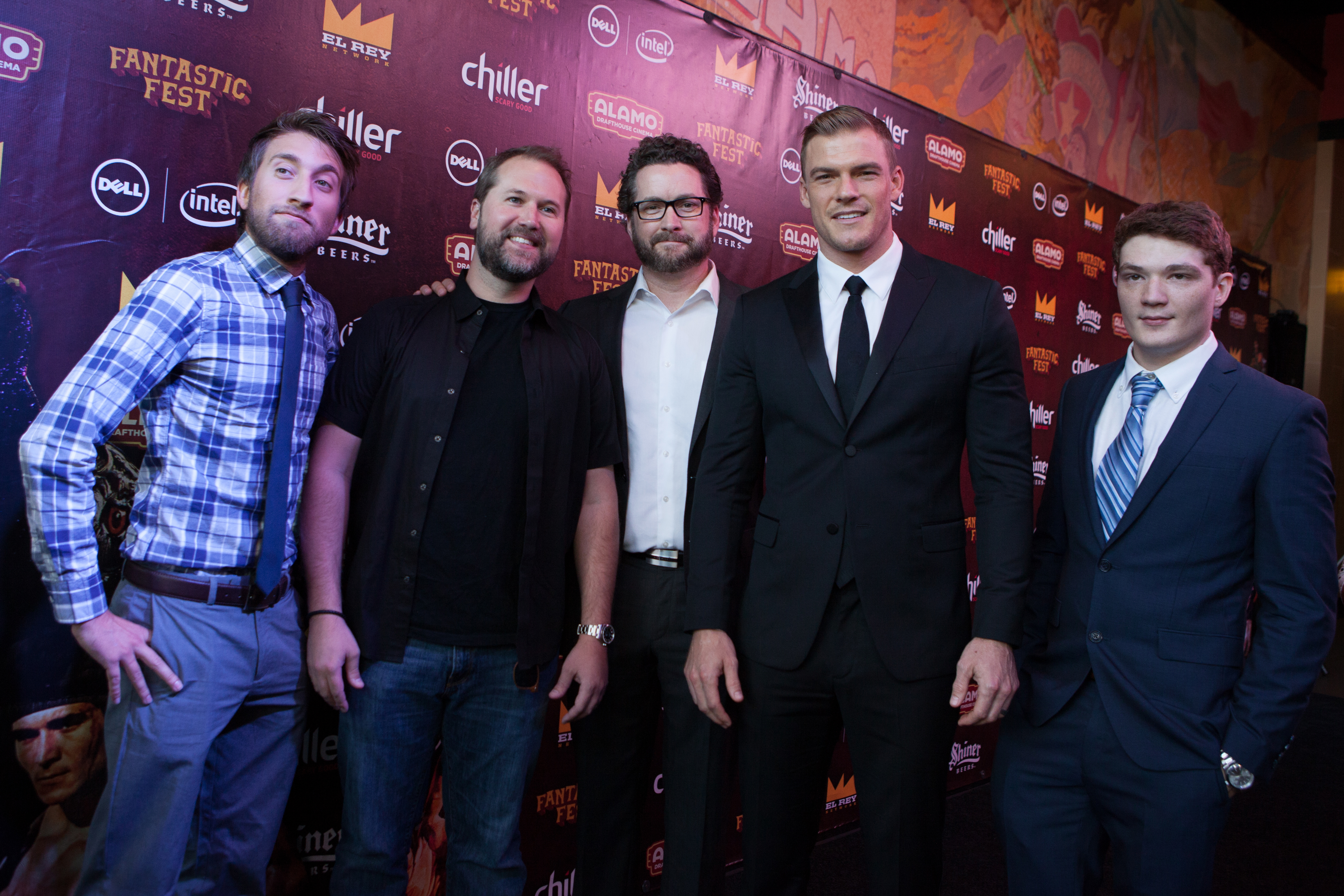
Alan Ritchson with the cast and director at the Lazer Team premiere in September 2015

His movie credits include a role in the 2006 film The Butcher, as well as a minor role in 2009's Fired Up! In 2007, director Robert Zemeckis used Ritchson for his facial image, physique, and in movement for actor Ray Winstone of the title character of Beowulf.

Ritchson portrayed Gloss, a tribute in the 75th Hunger Games, in The Hunger Games: Catching Fire (2013). Ritchson also portrayed Raphael in Teenage Mutant Ninja Turtles, a reboot to the Teenage Mutant Ninja Turtles film series after the four previous films. Ritchson would later criticize producers of the new TMNT live-action films, claiming they mistreated him and other actors portraying the turtles during and after filming. He returned to the role of Thad Castle in the Blue Mountain State movie, Blue Mountain State: The Rise of Thadland. Ritchson co-starred in Rooster Teeth Production's first feature-length movie—the science fiction comedy Lazer Team in January 2016. He also played a medium role in The Wedding Ringer.

In 2018, Ritchson was announced as the director, co-writer, and producer of Dark Web: Cicada 3301, a comedy-thriller film inspired by the eponymous organization. He also co-starred in it as an NSA agent. The film is the first original project of Phreaker Films, a film fund run by Ritchson. The rights for Dark Web: Cicada 3301 were acquired by Lionsgate in 2020, who released the film digitally on March 12, 2021. In 2022, he joined the cast of Fast X.

In 2024, Ritchson appeared in Jon Gunn's drama movie Ordinary Angels, written by Meg Tilly and Kelly Fremon Craig, as well as in Guy Ritchie's The Ministry of Ungentlemanly Warfare, an action comedy film. In 2025 he starred in the buddy action comedy film Playdate.

Ritchson appears in a web series titled Enormous Friends with his Blue Mountain State co-star, Rob Ramsay.

== Personal life ==
Ritchson met his wife, Catherine, while he was taking a dance class at a college and they married in May, 2006. They lived with their three sons in Florida for years. In 2023, the couple decided to sell their home and live on the road, allowing Ritchson to spend more time with his family. The family stayed in Airbnbs and hotels; Catherine, a financial analyst, homeschooled their sons. In September 2026, Ritchson announced he and Catherine had separated.

Ritchson has been diagnosed with bipolar disorder and has spoken openly about his struggles with the condition.

In March 2026, Ritchson was involved in a physical altercation with neighbor Ronnie Taylor in Brentwood, Tennessee; while Ritchson rode his motorcycle through the neighborhood, Taylor stepped in front of Ritchson, blocking his path and chastising Ritchson for this being a danger to children playing in the area. Taylor then initiated a physical confrontation and Ritchson acted in self-defense. The police were called, but Ritchson declined to pursue charges.

=== Religious and political views ===
Ritchson is a practicing Christian. He frequently discusses the significance of his faith, and has expressed a desire to support the development of Christian films in Hollywood. He started the YouTube channel InstaChurch, in January 2022, where he discusses his convictions. Though raised Catholic, he does not consider himself as such, stating "I can't for one second support the Catholic Church while there are still cardinals, bishops and priests being passed around with known pedophilic tendencies."

On April 3, 2024, The Hollywood Reporter published an interview of Ritchson in which he says that he had once been sexually assaulted by a "very famous photographer" and for this reason, he left his modeling career. He described the modeling industry as "legalized sex trafficking" for photographers.

In a February 2025 interview with GQ, Ritchson indicated that former congressman Matt Gaetz had been a classmate of his. Ritchson called Gaetz an "adversary" and "not a good dude". In the same interview, he expressed admiration for US senator Bernie Sanders, calling him a "hero".

Ritchson has expressed support for psychedelic therapy, and credits MDMA with treating his suicidal ideation.

== Filmography ==
Key
†	Denotes films that have not yet been released

=== Film ===
Year	Title	Role	Notes
2006	The Butcher	Mark	
2007	Steam	Roy	
2007	Beowulf	Beowulf	Body model for Beowulf
2008	Rex	Chase	
2009	Fired Up!	Bruce	
2013	The Hunger Games: Catching Fire	Gloss	
2014	Teenage Mutant Ninja Turtles	Raphael	Voice and motion capture
2015	The Wedding Ringer	Kip Loyola / Carew	
2016	Blue Mountain State: The Rise of Thadland	Thad Castle	Also producer and writer
2016	Lazer Team	Adam	
2016	Teenage Mutant Ninja Turtles: Out of the Shadows	Raphael	Voice and motion capture
2018	Office Uprising	Bob	
2019	Above the Shadows	Shayne Blackwell	
2019	The Turkey Bowl	Ronnie Best	Also executive producer
2020	Ghosts of War	Private Butchie	
2021	Dark Web: Cicada 3301	Agent Carver	Also director, producer, and writer
2023	Fast X	Agent Aimes	
2024	Ordinary Angels	Ed Schmitt	
2024	The Ministry of Ungentlemanly Warfare	Anders Lassen	
2025	Motor City	John Miller	Also producer
2025	Playdate	Jeff Eamon	Also executive producer
2026	War Machine	81	
2026	Runner	Hank Malone	Also producer
2026	The Man with the Bag †	Vince	Post-production; also producer
TBA	Untitled Mike Thornton biopic film †	Michael E. Thornton	Filming; also writer and producer

=== Television ===
Year	Title	Role	Notes
2004	American Idol	Himself (contestant)	Episode 3.1
2005–2010	Smallville	Arthur Curry / Aquaman	Guest role; 4 episodes
2006	Though None Go with Me	Army officer	Television film
2009	Head Case	Male Stripper	Episode: "Tying the... Not"
2009	Midnight Bayou	Lucian Manet	Television film
2010–2011	Blue Mountain State	Kevin Devlin "Thad" Castle	Main cast; 39 episodes
2010	CSI: Miami	Paul Arnett	Episode: "Spring Breakdown"
2011	90210	Tripp Wilson	Episode: "The Enchanted Donkey"
2012	Fred: The Show	Expired Cow	Episode: "Expired Cow"
2013	Hawaii Five-0	Freddie Hart	Episode: "Olelo Paʻa"
2014	The Rebels	Tyler Stokley	Episode: "Pilot"
2014	New Girl	Matt	Episode: "Micro"
2014	Infomercials	Kent Ross	Episode: "Alpha Chow"
2015	I Can Do That	Himself (contestant)	3 episodes
2015	Workaholics	Troy Torpey	Episode: "Speedo Racer"
2016	Black Mirror	Paul	Episode: "Nosedive"
2017	Blood Drive	Arthur Bailey	Main cast; 13 episodes
2018–2021	Titans	Hank Hall / Hawk	Recurring role (season 1), main cast (seasons 2–3); 18 episodes
2018	Alexa & Katie	Robbie	Episode: "Thanksgiving"
2019	Brooklyn Nine-Nine	Young Norm Scully	Episode: "Hitchcock & Scully"
2019	Supergirl	Hank Hall / Hawk	Episode: "Crisis on Infinite Earths: Part One"
2020	Legends of Tomorrow	Hank Hall / Hawk	Episode: "Crisis on Infinite Earths, Part 5"
2022–present	Reacher	Jack Reacher	Title role; 32 episodes (also executive producer)
2026	Neagley	Jack Reacher	Guest role; 2 episodes

=== Video games ===
- Beowulf: The Game (2007), as Beowulf (character model)

== Discography ==
Albums

- This Is Next Time (2006)
