= Taiwan Historical Relic Source Research Society =

The Taiwan Historical Relic Source Research Society (台灣史蹟源流研究會), formerly the Taiwan History Seminar (台灣史講習會), was an organization founded by China Youth Corps and Historical Research Committee of Tawian Province (台灣省文獻會) in Taiwan in the 1970s. It was meant to communicate the connection between Taiwan and China in ancient times, thereby combating Taiwan independence ideology. In October, 1969, curator of the National Museum of History Wang Yuqing (王宇清) co-hosted the "Special Exhibition of Zhongyuan Culture and Historical Relics of Taiwan (中原文化與台灣歷史文物特展)" with provincial and city research committees. After the exhibition, Wang Guofan (王國璠) of the Historical Research Committee of Taipei City helped gaining support from Chairman of the Historical Research Committee of Taiwan Province Chang Bingnan (張炳楠) and curator of the Taiwan Provincial Museum (省立台灣博物館) Liu Yen (劉衍), and the Taiwan History Seminar was formed. Help was also sought from the main corp of China Youth Anti-Communist National Salvation Corps (中國青年反共救國團) to allocate students from history departments of colleges and universities to participate in the lectures, and the Historical Research Committee of Taipei City and Taiwan Province were responsible for hosting the activities. In August 1970, a 5-day long “Lecture on Taiwan History” was held exclusively for students in history departments. Chen Chi-lu, Lin Hendao (林衡道), Hu Yiguan (胡一貫) and Tseng Guangshun (曾廣順) were hired as lecture faculties. In 1973, the organization changed its name into the Taiwan Historical Relic Source Research Society and continued to host summer lectures with topics relating to Taiwan history. These lectures featured esteemed scholars, immersive explorations of historical relics, research presentations, annual festivities, and the publication of magazines. Such events had significant allure for college students, given the dearth of Taiwan history courses available to them during that period.

== Origins of the organization ==
With the emergence of the Theory of the Undetermined Status of Taiwan, advocated by select overseas Taiwanese during the 1960s, and the support for Taiwan independence from Japanese scholars like Koga Michio (古賀三千雄) and Ikeda Hayato, alongside the assertions within the island that "Taiwanese people are not Chinese" and "Taiwanese culture is distinct from Chinese culture," there arose a pressing need to fortify education and research on Taiwan history. Consequently, there was a demand for the provision of courses on the general history of Taiwan or Taiwanese studies in colleges and universities. In 1969, the National History Museum's hosting of the “Special Exhibition of Zhongyuan Culture and Historical Relics of Taiwan” had received notable social responses.Then, in 1970, under instructions from Song Shihsyuan (宋時選), CEO of China Youth Corps, the “Taiwan History Seminar” was initiated by Wang Guofan of the Historical Research Committee of Taipei City and supported by chairman of the Historical Research Committee of Taiwan Province Chang Bingnan (張炳楠) and curator of Taiwan Provincial Museum Liu Yen. The initiation of such an event was to counter Taiwan independence separatist ideology, therefore two echelons of lectures were held in summer every year (for college students and teachers of primary schools and middle schools) to reinforce the relationship between China and Taiwan. In 1973, the organization was renamed as the Taiwan Historical Relic Source Research Society (1973-1999), whose purpose was to show the connection between Taiwan and China in ancient times, emphasizing the inseparable relationship between Taiwan and China from historical and geological perspectives, and had the intention of combating Taiwan independence ideology.

== Activities ==
=== Summer seminars ===
In August 1970, a 5-day long “Lecture on Taiwan History” was held exclusively for students in history departments. Chen Chi-lu, Lin Hendao (林衡道), Hu Yiguan (胡一貫) and Tseng Guangshun (曾廣順) were hired as lecture faculties. In summer 1973, two echelons were held in National Cheng Kung University. The first echelon was meant for college students, and the second echelon was meant for principals of primary and middle schools and publicly trained Chinese and history teachers. The China Youth Corps changed the organization’s name from Taiwan History Seminar to Taiwan Historical Relic Source Research Society. In July 1976, concurrent history seminars were conducted by the Historical Research Committees of Taipei and Taichung, with participants categorized into two distinct groups: the assembly of teachers from Taipei City and the collective of university students from Taiwan Province. When Kaohsiung was upgraded into a special municipality in 1979, it joined the annual hosting of the seminar. During the summer seminars, the Taiwan Historical Relic Source Research Society printed each year’s Youth Self-strengthening Movement-Lecture Notes of Taiwan Historical Relic Source Research Society (青年自強活動－台灣史蹟源流研究會講義). In winter 1978, it also printed Collection and Organization of Taiwan Historical Materials (台灣史料的收藏與整理) as lecture notes for that term.

=== Establishment of Taiwan Historical Research Center of the Republic of China ===
In August 1975, Wang Guofan wished to “establish an institution dedicated to curating Taiwan's historical materials, serving as a research hub for the wider community and enthusiasts of historical discourse” and he planned the “Taiwan Historical Research Center of the Republic of China” project, which received support from director of Taipei City’s Civil Affair Bureau Yang Baofa (楊寶發), CEO of China Youth Corps Main Corps Song Shihsyuan, the Office of Civil Affairs of Taiwan Provincial Government, and Historical Research Committee of Taiwan Province. In 1976, the historical research committees of Taipei City, Taiwan Province, and Kaohsiung City and relevant units jointly set up the Taiwan Historical Research Center, which was located at the Historical research Committee of Taipei City.

The center had three important tasks: The first was issuing the Correspondence of Taiwan History and Relics (史聯雜誌), which welcomes submissions from individuals of various backgrounds and students, with the center's research team assuming editorial responsibilities. The second was to operate the Historical Relic Source Research Society’s annual meeting, activities include:

1. An essay contest open for student submissions. Judges would review and elect the top three works for publication;
2. After the students graduate, “historical relic teams” would be formed with counties and cities as units, they would then publish surveys and studies on local historical relics;
3. The research team would plan and hold seminars. For example, in 1986, the “Research on Taiwan History and Excavation of Historical Materials Seminar” was held, bringing together 18 esteemed scholars and local historians. The seminar in 1987 was co-organized with China Institute of Ethnology (中國民族學會) and Taiwan History Field Research Studio of Academia Sinica, 16 papers were presented, such as Huang Rongluo's (黃榮洛) "Preliminary Exploration on the Henan Soldier Killing Incident.”

The Taiwan Historical Research Center had published works such as Complete Works of Wu Ziguang (吳子光全集), Poetry and Grass of the Cypress Mansion (柏莊詩草), and Poetry Deformity (詩畸, bowl hitting chants). Among these works, Collection of Taiwan Historical Stories (台灣史叢談) was the Youth Corps’ template of Taiwan history, which emphasized the geological, cultural and blood line inseparability between Taiwan and China; Taiwan was mentioned in the Book of Documents, and it was emphasized that Taiwanese people had resisted Qing Dynasty and Japan. Due to the extensive efforts of the Taiwan Historical Relic Source Research Society, this book gained widespread circulation and became ubiquitous.

== Influence ==
Scholar Wen Chen-hua (溫振華) believed that the formation of the Taiwan Historical Relic Source Research Society was a direct response to the rising calls for Taiwan independence and placed particular emphasis on the interconnectedness between Taiwan and China. Taiwan history did gain some attention from primary school and middle school teachers under the name of “local history" in the organization’s activities, and generated the concept that “local history is equal to Taiwan history.” Scholar Hsu Hsueh-chi believed that activities of the Taiwan Historical Relic Source Research Society allowed students to delve into Taiwan history through surveying historical relics, it catalyzed advancements in Taiwan history research.
