= Yin Chang-yi =

Taiwanese historian

Yin Chang-yi (Chinese: 尹章義; pinyin: Yǐn Zhāngyì; born May 4, 1944) is a Taiwanese historian. He received a master's degree from the Graduate Institute of History at National Taiwan University. He later served as a professor in the Department of History at Fu Jen Catholic University before retiring, and subsequently transferred to the Department of History at Chinese Culture University, where he also retired.

In the early stage of his academic career, Yin specialized in Ming dynasty history and the history of Chinese historiography. He later became well known in academic circles for his research on Taiwanese history, and in his later years turned his attention to the history of medicine and science.

== Biography ==
Yin Chang-yi was born in Wuchang, Hubei. His father was a Han Chinese from Hubei, and his mother was a Manchu bannerman aristocrat (Hezhe ethnic group). After his parents married, his father worked in government service and later followed the Republic of China government to Taiwan. The family settled near the Republic of China Air Force dependents’ village close to Shuinan Airport in Taichung City. Yin Chang-yi was the eldest among six siblings.

Yin's mother exercised extremely strict discipline and frequently subjected her children to corporal punishment. Possibly as a result, Yin associated with gangs during his junior and senior high school years and was nicknamed “Little Boss.” It was not until his third year of high school, when he read Cao Pi's Dianlun: On Literature, particularly the line “Literature is a great enterprise for governing the state, an immortal achievement,” that he realized such accomplishments were unattainable for a gang leader. Encouraged as well by former associates, he resolved to pursue learning and was eventually admitted to the Department of History at Fu Jen Catholic University.

In the year he graduated from high school, Yin purchased Theory of Assimilation (Dōkaron), published in 1914 by Japanese scholar Nakanishi Ushirō, from a second-hand bookstall on Zhonghua Road in Taichung. This work sparked his interest in Taiwanese history. However, during his undergraduate and graduate studies, due to the structure of the curriculum and the fact that Taiwanese historical studies had not yet fully developed, he instead wrote his master's thesis on “Horse Administration in the Ming Dynasty.”

After completing his master's degree and beginning to teach at various universities, Yin initially intended to carry on the unfinished work of his mentor Bao Zunpeng (former director of the National Central Library and author of A History of the Chinese Navy) by researching Chinese maritime power history. His associate professor promotion paper, titled “Tang He and Coastal Defense in Southeast China in the Early Ming,” also addressed China's southeastern coast and Taiwanese history. However, due to various obstacles, he abandoned this line of research. From 1976 onward, he devoted himself to the study of the history of Chinese historiography.

In the spring of 1980, at the invitation of then–Xinzhuang Township head Zheng Yu-zhen, Yin authored Gazetteer of Xinzhuang, formally marking his entry into Taiwanese historical research.

== Academic evaluation ==
=== Family history ===
Sheng Qingyi, Editor-in-Chief of the Taipei County Gazetteer and Head of the Compilation Division of the Taiwan Provincial Documentation Committee, stated:

“In recent years, research on Taiwanese history has begun to achieve new breakthroughs; Scholars are no longer confined to old books but have penetrated deeply into local communities to seek firsthand historical materials. This trend was initiated by our colleague, Wang Shiqing, through the collection of folk materials, and was further advanced by Professor Yin Chang-yi of Fu Jen Catholic University. Subsequently, young scholars, unwilling to lag behind, followed suit, conducting rural investigations, paying out of pocket to obtain firsthand sources in pursuit of authentic scholarship, demonstrating courage to brave hardships without hesitation.”

Wang Shih-ching , Distinguished Chair Professor at the Institute of Taiwan History, Academia Sinica, noted:

"This subsequently drew scholarly attention to the collection and utilization of folk archival documents. For example, Professor Yin Chang-yi of Fu Jen Catholic University collected the Zhang Guangfu documents and discovered a land-reclamation contract from the forty-eighth year of the Kangxi reign (1709) involving Chen Laizhang; Wu Xueming of National Taiwan Normal University uncovered a large corpus of Jin Guangfu documents; Professor Huang Fu-san of National Taiwan University collected extensive Lin family documents from Wufeng; and Professor Hsu Hsueh-chi of Academia Sinica collected documents from the Lin family of Longjing. These works all contributed innovative research to Qing-era Taiwanese land reclamation history and family history."

Lin Yu-ru (Academia Sinica) and Lee Yu-chung (National Tsing Hua University) wrote:

"Yin Chang-yi's The Migration and Development History of the Zhang Shixiang Family—A Case Study of Early Qing Minnan Gentry Migration to Taiwan (1983) was the first monograph to study Taiwanese family history through classical documents. It not only resolved many mysteries in the history of Taipei’s land development, but also initiated a new trend in Taiwanese family history research."

Huang Fu-san, former director of the Institute of Taiwan History, Academia Sinica, remarked:

"Gentry families often controlled the direction of local development. Understanding family development history allows one to grasp the key to history… At present, family history research has accumulated substantial results, with significant contributions by Hsu Hsueh-chi, Yin Chang-yi, and others.”
