= Chelsea Zhang =

American actress (born 1996)

- Born: Chelsea T. Zhang; November 4, 1996 (age 29); Pittsburgh, Pennsylvania, U.S.
- Education: USC Marshall School of Business (BSc)
- Occupation: Actress
- Years active: 2012–present

Chelsea T. Zhang (born November 4, 1996) is an American actress. She portrayed Rose Wilson / Ravager in the HBO Max superhero series Titans (2019) and had recurring roles in the Disney Channel series Andi Mack (2017–2018) and the Netflix series Daybreak (2019). Her films include Me and Earl and the Dying Girl (2015), Relish (2019), and Love in Taipei (2023).

== Early life and education ==
Zhang is from Pittsburgh, Pennsylvania. She was a Junior Olympic figure skating qualifier in her preteens. She attended North Allegheny Senior High School. At the age of 16, she was accepted early to the University of Southern California. She graduated from the Marshall School of Business with a degree in business administration in 2017.

== Career ==
Zhang made her debut in 2012 film The Perks of Being a Wallflower. She played the role of Naomi in the 2015 film Me and Earl and the Dying Girl.

From 2017 to 2018, Zhang played the recurring role of Brittany, Bex Mack (Lilan Bowden)'s boss at The Fringe, in seasons 1 and 2 of the Disney Channel series Andi Mack.

Zhang played the role of Sawyer in the 2018 independent feature film Relish, which was featured in several international film festivals, including the 2019 Burbank International Film Festival, where Zhang received several nominations and awards for best supporting actress and best ensemble.

In March 2019, it was announced that Zhang would star as Rose Wilson in the first live action iteration of the character in second season of the DC Universe series Titans. She also played KJ in the 2019 Netflix adaptation of Daybreak.

In November 2021, it was announced Zhang would play Sophie in the film adaptation of the Abigail Hing Wen novel Loveboat, Taipei, released in November 2023 as Love in Taipei.

== Filmography ==
=== Film ===
Year	Title	Role	Notes
2012	The Perks of Being a Wallflower	Shakespeare girl	
2015	Me and Earl and the Dying Girl	Naomi	
2018	Relish	Sawyer	
2023	Love in Taipei	Sophie	

=== Television ===
Year	Title	Role	Notes
2015	Chasing Life	Shelby	Episode: "April Just Wants to Have Fun"
2015	Scream Queens	Japanese sorority girl	Episode: "Ghost Stories"
2016	The Cheerleader Murders	Stacy	TV film
2017	The Rachels	Gina	TV film
2017–2018	Andi Mack	Brittany	Recurring role (seasons 1–2)
2018	The Perfect Mother	Helen	TV film
2019	Daybreak	KJ	Recurring role
2019	Titans	Rose Wilson	Main role (season 2)
2020	Love in the Time of Corona	Kaia	Recurring role

== Awards and nominations ==
Year	Work	Award	Category	Result
2018	Relish	Creation International Film Festival	Best Ensemble Cast	Won
2019	Relish	Los Angeles Film Awards	Best Ensemble	Won
2019	Relish	Cinema WorldFest Awards	Best Supporting Actress	Won
2019	Relish	Cinema WorldFest Awards	Best Ensemble Cast	Won
2019	Relish	Madrid International Film Festival	Best Supporting Actress	Nominated
2019	Relish	Queen Palm International Film Festival	Best Supporting Actress	Won
