= Ross Butler (actor) =

American actor

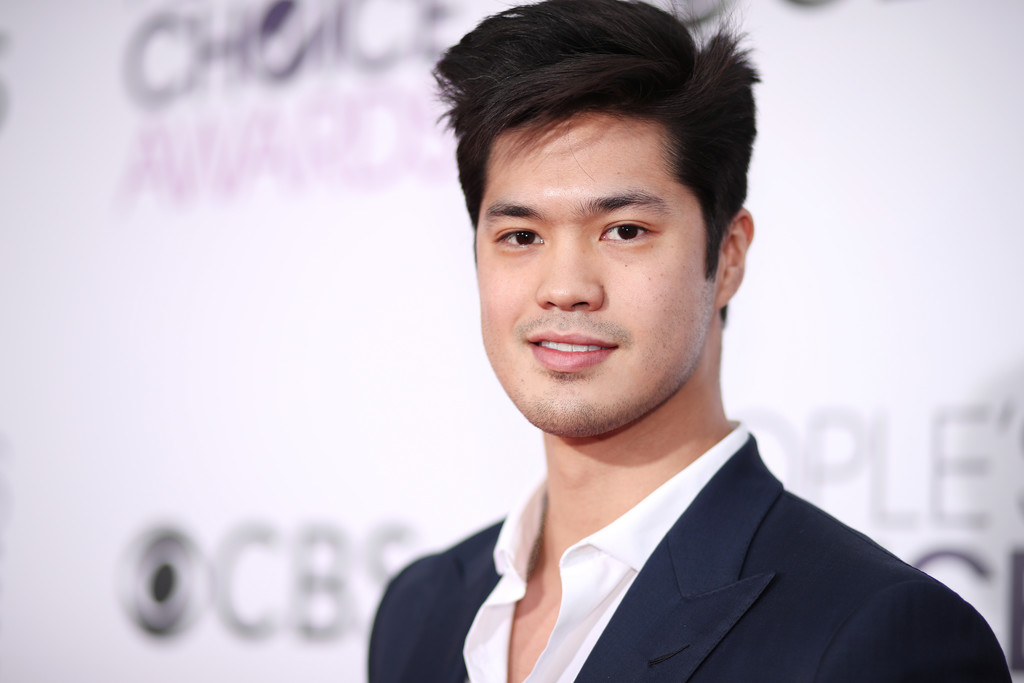
- Ross Butler in 2017
- Born: Ross Fleming Butler; May 17, 1990 (age 36); Singapore
- Occupation: Actor
- Years active: 2012–present
- Height: 191 cm (6 ft 3 in)

Ross Fleming Butler (born 17 May 1990) is a Singaporean-born American actor. He is best known for his role as Zach Dempsey in the Netflix series 13 Reasons Why and as Brett Willis on K.C. Undercover. He also played Reggie Mantle in the first season of The CW series Riverdale (2017). In 2019, he joined the DC Extended Universe as Superhero Eugene Choi in the film Shazam!, and reprised the role in Shazam! Fury of the Gods in 2023.

== Early life ==
Butler was born in Singapore to a Chinese-Malaysian mother and an English-Dutch father. He lived in Jakarta, Indonesia before moving to the United States when he was four and was raised by his mother in Fairfax, Virginia, a suburb outside Washington, D.C.

He studied chemical and biomolecular engineering at Ohio State University. He dropped out after a year and later moved back to Virginia, where he took courses at a community college. He then moved to Los Angeles at the age of 20.

== Career ==
Butler took his first acting class at age 21. He got his start with roles in student films and low budget projects. He landed his breakthrough recurring role on the Disney Channel series K.C. Undercover. He had roles in the Disney Channel films Teen Beach 2 and Perfect High.

In 2017, he was cast as Reggie Mantle in Riverdale. He was later cast as Zach Dempsey in 13 Reasons Why, and left Riverdale due to his commitment to 13 Reasons Why. He would reprise Mantle in Riverdale's 100th episode "The Jughead Paradox" in a scene alongside his successor Charles Melton's portrayal.

In 2019, he played adult Eugene Choi in the superhero film Shazam!. He also played Trevor, Peter Kavinsky's best friend, in To All the Boys: P.S. I Still Love You, released in 2020 by Netflix.

In 2020, it was announced that Butler would star alongside Kiernan Shipka in the Quibi series Swimming with Sharks. The project remained unreleased after the demise of Quibi's platform, but was released by Roku in the spring of 2022. Butler also starred in Claudia Tan's Perfect Addiction alongside Kiana Madeira and Matthew Notzka, which was released internationally on Amazon Prime on March 24, 2023, and received a limited theatrical release in the USA.

Butler then appeared in the film adaption of Abigail Hing Wen's Love in Taipei (previously titled "Loveboat Taipei") opposite Ashley Liao. The film had its debut on Paramount+ in the summer of 2023. Upcoming projects include Butler appearing in the romantic comedy Worth the Wait, with Lana Condor, the thriller Zipline, and the fantasy comedy Shiver.

== Filmography ==
=== Film ===
| Year | Title | Role | Notes |
|---|---|---|---|
| 2013 | The Internship | Noah #2 | |
| 2013 | Work It Out | Eddie Peon | Short film |
| 2014 | Two Bedrooms | Toby | |
| 2014 | Rules of the Trade | Leroy | |
| 2015 | Hacker's Game | Jeremy | |
| 2018 | Flavors of Youth | Limo | Voice, English dub |
| 2018 | Hacker's Game Redux | Jeremy | completed |
| 2019 | Shazam! | Super Hero Eugene | |
| 2020 | To All the Boys: P.S. I Still Love You | Trevor Pike | |
| 2021 | To All the Boys: Always and Forever | Trevor Pike | |
| 2021 | Raya and the Last Dragon | Leader of Spine | Voice |
| 2023 | Shazam! Fury of the Gods | Super Hero Eugene | |
| 2023 | Perfect Addiction | Kayden Williams | |
| 2023 | Love in Taipei | Rick Woo | Also executive producer |
| 2025 | Worth the Wait | Kai | |
| TBA | Zipline | TBA | Post-Production |
| TBA | Shiver | TBA | Post-production |

=== Television ===
| Year | Title | Role | Notes |
|---|---|---|---|
| 2012 | The Gateway Life | Allen | Television film |
| 2013 | Major Crimes | Ian Yorita | 1 episode |
| 2013 | Camp Sunshine | Tony | Television film |
| 2014 | Star Seed | Chris Choi | |
| 2014 | Hollywood | Chris | |
| 2014 | Dog Park | Scott | 1 episode |
| 2014 | Happyland | Scott | 1 episode |
| 2015 | Teen Beach 2 | Spencer Watkins | Television film |
| 2015 | Perfect High | Nate | Television film |
| 2015 | Chasing Life | Hunter | 3 episodes |
| 2015–2016 | K.C. Undercover | Brett Willis | Recurring role, 8 episodes |
| 2016 | Teen Wolf | Nathan | 3 episodes |
| 2017, 2021 | Riverdale | Reggie Mantle | Recurring role, 7 episodes |
| 2017–2020 | 13 Reasons Why | Zach Dempsey | Main role, 49 episodes |
| 2020 | Swimming with Sharks | Alex | Main role, 6 episodes |
| 2021, 2023 | Awkwafina Is Nora from Queens | Chuck | 2 episodes |
| TBA | Army of the Dead: Lost Vegas | Chen | Voice |

=== Music video ===
| Year | Title | Artist | Notes |
|---|---|---|---|
| 2018 | Waste It on Me | Steve Aoki (feat. BTS) | |
| 2019 | Graduation | Juice Wrld (feat. Benny Blanco) | as Scott Hammer |
| 2021 | Like That | JP Saxe | |
| 2021 | One Mississippi | Kane Brown | |
