= Huang Fu-san =

Taiwanese historian

- 黃富三
- Occupation: Historian

Academic background
- Education: National Taiwan University (BA, MA); University of Cambridge (MLitt, PhD)
- Thesis: The Role of the Female Workers in the Textile Industry during the British Industrial Revolution (1972)

Chinese name
- Traditional Chinese: 黃富三
- Simplified Chinese: 黄富三
Transcriptions
Standard Mandarin
- Hanyu Pinyin: Huáng Fùsān
Southern Min
- Hokkien POJ: N̂g Hù-saⁿ

Huang Fu-san (Chinese: 黃富三) is a Taiwanese historian.

== Education ==
Huang Fu-san earned his master's degree specializing in the history of Taiwan from National Taiwan University, supervised by Yang Yun-ping. With Huang's aid, Chen Chi-lu organized the first Seminars on Taiwan Studies at NTU from 1965 to 1967. The seminars were sponsored by the Harvard–Yenching Institute and ended when Huang won a scholarship provided by the Ministry of Education to pursue a doctorate at the University of Cambridge. He earned a Master of Letters (M.Litt.) and a Ph.D. from Cambridge.

== Career ==
Huang completed his dissertation, The Role of the Female Workers in the Textile Industry during the British Industrial Revolution, in 1972, and returned to NTU as a lecturer on western history. Huang's adviser Yang persuaded him to focus on Taiwanese history, and he began lecturing on the subject in 1975. Huang reestablished the Seminars on Taiwan Studies with funding from the Lim Pen-Yuan Cultural and Educational Foundation, founded in 1977. Between September 1986 and June 1987, Huang was an associate of the Harvard–Yenching Institute. Huang stated in 1994 that his university studies on Taiwanese history covered Koxinga and the Kingdom of Tungning, but did not include the period of Japanese rule. When he began teaching, Huang worked to incorporate the start of Japanese authority over Taiwan in 1895 into his courses. In 1993, Huang accepted Kwang-chih Chang's invitation to serve as the first director of the preparatory office that became the Institute of Taiwan History, a division of Academia Sinica. Huang has also worked for Academia Sinica as an adjunct research fellow. Additionally, Huang has served on the Cultural Assets Review Committee convened by the Taipei City Government. Huang retired from the Institute of Taiwan History in 2010.

Huang has offered commentary on the Dutch Formosa period, as well as Taiwan under Japanese rule. Huang has also discussed Japan–Taiwan relations, and a frequent topic of his published research, the Wufeng Lin family.

== Publications ==
Huang book The Female Workers and the Industrialization in Post-war Taiwan was published in 1977, and translated to Japanese in 2006. He and Hsu Hsueh-chi were two of five historians invited by the Taiwanese government in 1991 to compile what became A Research Report on 228 Incident, published in 1993. In 2006, Huang wrote A Brief History of Taiwan--A Sparrow Transformed into a Phoenix, an e-book published online by the Government Information Office.
