= Abigail Hing Wen =

American writer, film producer, lawyer and speaker

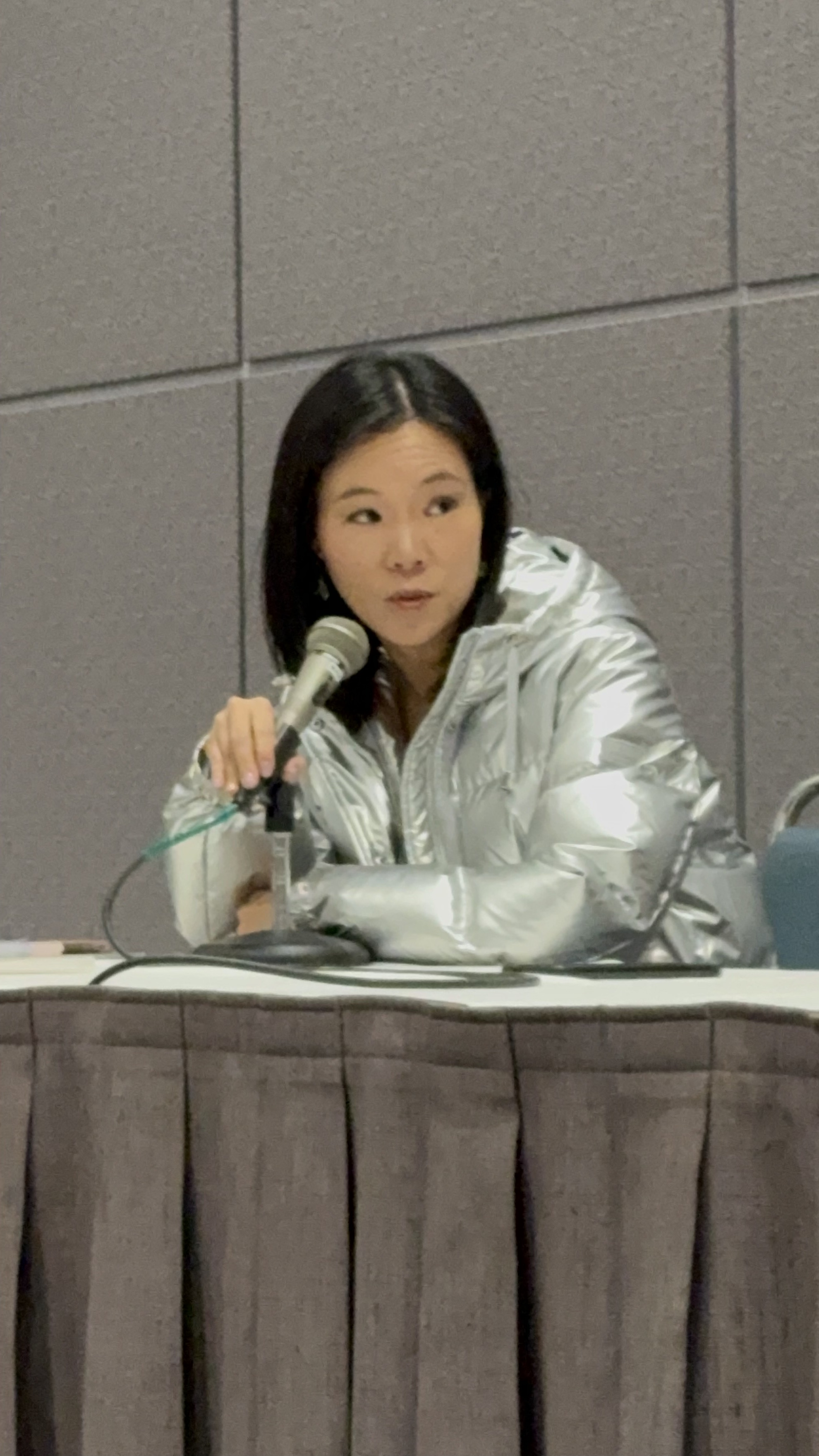
- Wen speaking at Los Angeles Comic Con in December 2023
- Born: West Virginia, U.S.
- Education: Harvard University; Columbia Law School; Vermont College of Fine Arts
- Occupations: Author; public speaker on venture capital, artificial intelligence and the creative life
- Writing career
- Notable works: Loveboat, Taipei trilogy; Kisses, Codes and Conspiracies; The Vale; The Vale--Origins

Chinese name
- Chinese: 邢立美
- Hanyu Pinyin: Xíng Lìměi
- Hokkien POJ: Hêng Li̍p-bí
- Website: www.abigailhingwen.com

Abigail Hing Wen (Chinese: 邢立美; pinyin: Xíng Lìměi) is an American writer, film producer, director and speaker. Her debut young adult novel, Loveboat, Taipei, was purchased in a multi-house auction by HarperCollins in a two-book deal, along with Loveboat Reunion. It debuted on the New York Times Bestseller List where it remained for multiple weeks and has been adapted to the film Love in Taipei and released through Paramount+ as of August 10, 2023. On August 2024, Love in Taipei was released on Netflix.

Loveboat, Taipei follows the journey of an Asian American teen whose parents send her from Ohio to Taipei to study Mandarin for the summer at a program nicknamed Loveboat. It is a coming-of-age story exploring love, family, multifaceted identity and intersectionality. Wen's companion novel, Loveboat Reunion, follows two of the main characters from Loveboat, Taipei as they reconnect and write their own futures on a wild, unexpected reunion. The novel draws inspiration from Wen's work in Silicon Valley, with a girl trying to navigate her fashion interests and interests in AI. The third novel, Loveboat Forever, (November 7, 2023) is set six years later, and follows the gang and their community through new coming of age journeys.

Wen's stand alone YA thriller/romantic comedy, Kisses, Codes, and Conspiracies, was released on August 13, 2024 and hit the USA Today Best Seller's List. People Magazine published an exclusive first-look excerpt.

In February 2025, Deadline announced Lea Salonga would star in a short film prequel to Wen's now NYT best selling novel, The Vale. The short film, written and directed by Wen, held its world premiere at San Diego Comic-Con in July 2026 to an oversubscribed audience of almost 1000 people, and global online premiere on Omeleto. It is a hybrid live action and animated film, with John Aoshima (Annie nominated co-director of Ultraman: Rising) serving as animation director and Neil Blevins (Incredibles I, II, Wall-E, Up) serving as production designer. The Vale follows a struggling inventor family in Silicon Valley that creates a virtual reality world and explores questions about ethics and AI.

The Vale novel debuted on the New York Times Best Sellers List and was featured in People Magazine, the South China Morning Post and the World Journal in a piece titled "Lawyer Turns Author Explores the AI Virtual World".

Wen's sixth novel, her first graphic novel, The Fidget Booth, is set to launch Spring 2027 from HarperAlley, the graphic novel division of HarperCollins.

== Early life ==
Abigail Hing Wen was born Abigail Geraldine Lim Hing in Wheeling, West Virginia, as a daughter of ethnic Chinese immigrants. She grew up in Solon, Ohio. Her maternal grandfather is Amado Lim, a Christian Filipino-Chinese businessman who founded the Manila Metropolitan Medical Center.

== Education ==
Wen attended Solon High School, where she was the valedictorian. She was selected as one of 120 U.S. Presidential Scholars, high school seniors invited to Washington, D.C., to meet then President Bill Clinton.

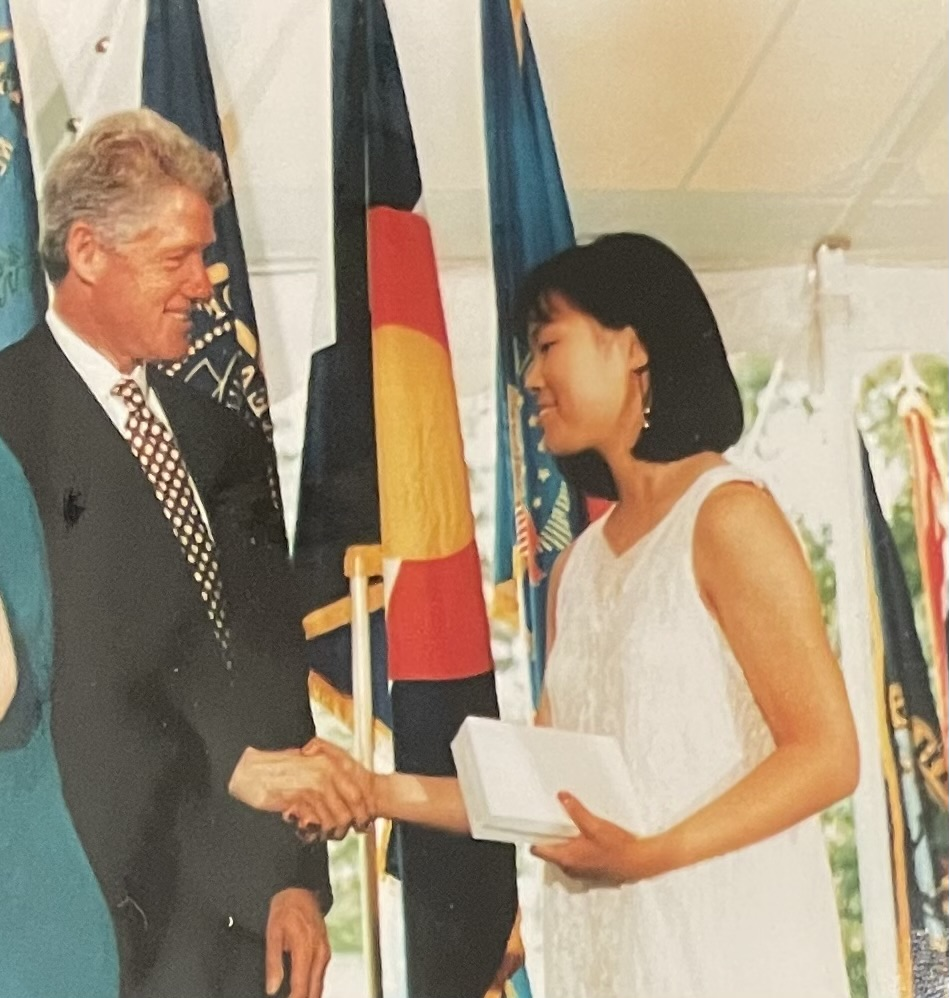
Wen with President Bill Clinton at the U.S. Presidential Scholars Ceremony.

As a Presidential Scholar, she was invited by the Taiwanese government to attend the study tour program at Chien Tan, which eventually formed the setting of her first novel, Loveboat, Taipei. Wen studied at Harvard University, earning her B.A. magna cum laude in government and international relations. She wrote her senior thesis on China under Professor Roderick MacFarquhar. She served on the student governing board of the Harvard Institute of Politics (IOP). Wen earned her JD at Columbia Law School and MFA in Writing from Vermont College of Fine Arts, studying under Kathi Appelt, A.M. Jenkins, and Martine Leavitt.

== Career ==
Prior to moving to Silicon Valley, Wen spent ten years in Washington, D.C., working on Capitol Hill for the Senate Judiciary Committee, as a law clerk to Judge Judith W. Rogers on the United States Court of Appeals for the DC Circuit, and in private practice at the international law firms of Sullivan & Cromwell and Covington & Burling.

=== Literary career ===
In 2019, Wen's debut novel, Loveboat, Taipei, sold in a multi-house auction to HarperCollins, for a two-book deal. It debuted at #9 on the New York Times Bestseller List where it remained for multiple weeks at #8 and #9. Loveboat, Taipei was published on January 7, 2020, by HarperTeen and has been adapted for screen as Love in Taipei streaming on Paramount+ as of August 10, 2023, for which Wen served as an executive producer. The story is inspired by Wen's experience on the Love Boat program she attended the summer after her freshman year at Harvard. Wen and Loveboat, Taipei have been featured in NBC Bay Area Show, World Journal, the South China Morning Post, Cosmopolitan, and People en Español. The novel appeared on a number of Most Anticipated lists including The Boston Globe, Book Riot, Bustle, BuzzFeed, The UK Evening Standard, The Nerd Daily, Seventeen, and She Reads. Loveboat, Taipei was selected as a Barnes & Noble Young Adult Book Club Pick and it appeared at number 1 on Cosmopolitan's 25 Best Audiobooks of 2020 list.

Love in Taipei stars Ashley Liao and Ross Butler and was ranked a Top #10 comedy on Paramount+. Wen made a brief cameo in the film. Wen, as executive producer, and the film have been covered by The Hollywood Reporter, Entertainment Weekly, The New York Times, Variety, Deadline, CBS Mornings, People, and AsAmNews.

In June 2021, Wen was featured in the Forbes AI Ethics series, where she talked about her role in Partnership on AI, as well as her upcoming literary works. Her second novel, Loveboat Reunion, was published on January 25, 2022, as well as The Idiom Algorithm the same month, a short story she wrote for the Macmillan Serendipity anthology. A third novel, Loveboat Forever, set six years after Loveboat, Taipei, was published on November 7, 2023.

Wen’s novel, Kisses, Codes, and Conspiracies, inspired by her short story, The Idiom Algorithm, was released on August 13, 2024 and hit the USA Today Best Seller's List. It follows three Palo Alto High School teens on a heist through the San Francisco Bay Area. People Magazine published an exclusive first-look excerpt.

Abigail Hing Wen at San Diego Comic-Con 2026 for the World Premiere of The Vale -- Origins

In February 2025, Deadline announced Lea Salonga would star in a short film prequel to Wen's now NYT best selling novel, The Vale (pub date September 2025). The short film, written and directed by Wen, was privately screened at venues including Rideback Ranch and Harvard's Signet Society, and held its world premiere at San Diego Comic-Con in July 2026 to an oversubscribed audience of almost 1000 people, and global online premiere on Omeleto. The short film is a hybrid live action and animated film written and directed by Wen, with John Aoshima (Annie nominated co-director of Ultraman: Rising) serving as animation director and Neil Blevins (Incredibles I, II, Wall-E, Up) serving as production designer. The Vale follows a struggling inventor family in Silicon Valley that creates a virtual reality world and explores questions about ethics and AI. The Vale novel debuted at #6 on the New York Times Best Sellers List and was featured in People Magazine, the South China Morning Post and the World Journal in March 2025 in a piece titled "Lawyer Turns Author Explores the AI Virtual World".

Wen's sixth novel, her first graphic novel, The Fidget Booth, is set to launch Spring 2027 from HarperAlley, the graphic novel division of HarperCollins.

=== Leadership and Community Involvement ===
Wen serves on the Board of Directors of Harvardwood and of Wedgwood Circle. She is a member of the accelerator Rideback Rise in Hollywood, where she has taught workshops on adapting script into novels and short stories. She served as judge for the Golden Trailer Awards in 2025 and 2026, selecting the industry's best trailers. She is a frequent keynote speaker at corporations, universities, and schools.

=== Technology ===
Prior to turning to creating content full time, Wen worked in venture capital and artificial intelligence in Silicon Valley. She describes her career in film and media as working at the intersection of all her lives: creative storytelling, technology and finance.

While working in tech, Wen served as a board observer for Two Bit Circus, a Los Angeles-based virtual reality entertainment company. She served as co-chair of the Partnership on AI Expert Working Group for Fairness, Transparency and Accountability.

Wen previously hosted the podcast Intel on AI. Her guests have included founders in the field, such as Andrew Ng and Yann LeCun, as well as Google DeepMind, US Congress, The World Bank and leading AI faculty at MIT, Stanford, and University of California, Berkeley.

== Bibliography ==
=== Novels ===
- Loveboat, Taipei. HarperCollins (2020)
- Loveboat Reunion. HarperCollins (2022)
- Loveboat Forever, HarperCollins (2023)
- Kisses, Codes and Conspiracies, Macmillan (2024)
- The Vale, Third State Books (2025)

=== Short stories ===
- The Idiom Algorithm. Macmillan Serendipity anthology (2022)
