= Playing for Keeps (2012 film) =

2012 film by Gabriele Muccino

- Theatrical release poster
- Directed by: Gabriele Muccino
- Written by: Robbie Fox
- Produced by: Gerard Butler; Kevin Misher; Jonathan Mostow; Alan Siegel; John Thompson; Heidi Jo Markel
- Starring: Gerard Butler; Jessica Biel; Uma Thurman; Catherine Zeta-Jones; Dennis Quaid; Judy Greer; James Tupper; Aiden Potter; Noah Lomax
- Cinematography: Peter Menzies Jr.
- Edited by: Padraic McKinley
- Music by: Andrea Guerra
- Production companies: Nu Image; Misher Films; Millennium Films
- Distributed by: FilmDistrict
- Release date: December 7, 2012
- Running time: 106 minutes
- Country: United States
- Language: English
- Budget: $35-55 million
- Box office: $27.8 million

Playing for Keeps is a 2012 American romantic comedy film directed by Gabriele Muccino, starring Gerard Butler with Jessica Biel, Catherine Zeta-Jones, Dennis Quaid, Uma Thurman and Judy Greer in supporting roles.

Once professional athlete George moves to Virginia to win back his ex Stacie and their son Lewis.

The film was released on December 7, 2012, in the United States and Canada by FilmDistrict. It received negative reviews from critics and was a box office bomb, grossing just $27.8 million on a $55 million budget.

== Plot ==
Former professional footballer George Dryer played for Celtic, Liverpool, D.C. United and the Scotland national team. Largely seen as a "has been", his attempts to sell his sports memorabilia and become a sports announcer are met with ambivalence. George's relationship with his son Lewis is equally unsuccessful. When he discovers his ex-wife Stacie is remarrying, he grows despondent.

After dropping off his sports broadcasting audition tape, George goes to Lewis’ soccer practice. The team's parents want him to become the new coach, and he reluctantly agrees. George is bribed by Carl King to give his children preferential treatment, and attracts the attention of the divorced Barb, ex-sportscaster Denise, and Carl's wife Patti.

At practice, George is invited to a dinner party at Carl's, approached by Barb, and told by Denise that his audition tape has potential. At the party, George learns Carl has been having affairs; unbeknownst to him, Patti knows. Carl lends George a Ferrari as he "takes care of his friends", which George drives to see Stacie. They discuss their relationship, but she insists the past is far gone.

Returning home, George finds Barb waiting. After confessing her loneliness, and showing him her dating app profile, he compliments her leading to her seducing him and the pair having sex together.

Carl calls George to bail him out of jail, as he got into a fight at the party, making George late to pick up Lewis. So he lets him ride in his lap and drive the Ferrari. George discovers Lewis is sad that his mother is marrying Matt, whom he will not call "dad".

Denise calls, explaining that ESPN is looking for a new football sportscaster, so George must come with her to the studio to record a tape. In the empty studio, George struggles to record a professional tape, but eventually she inspires him enough that he gains confidence and records a TV-worthy tape.

Immediately afterwards, Denise hops on to the table, and after a brief conversation, seduces him into sex. This causes George to be late to pick up Lewis again, straining his relationship with both Lewis and Stacie.

Arriving home, George is berated by his landlord Param for not paying his rent but driving a Ferrari, while Patti calls him supposedly from his bed. Realizing she is actually in Param’s bed, George distracts him with Carl's bribe money. Patti continues to approach him sexually, but he rebuffs her, telling her that she should leave Carl rather than have an affair.

Lewis sees Denise kiss George as Denise tells him she talked to some people at ESPN, leading him to realize why his father was late. He is further angered when George misses seeing his goal due to both Barb and Denise flirting with him, Barb calling him mid game, whilst Denise makes a motion that she mentioned to him earlier, as a reference to their night together. This spurs Lewis into fighting during the match, and telling his mother he wants to quit football.

Coaxing Lewis into playing football in the rain, George and his son bond. Stacie and George reconnect romantically, complicating her relationship with Matt.

George receives the ESPN job thanks to Denise, but he rejects her romantically. The job requires him moving to Connecticut, and he asks Stacie to move with him. She initially refuses him, but when he meets her at her car, she kisses him. At that day’s game, George learns Barb is dating Param, and Carl's P.I. has taken misleading pictures of Patti in George's house. As George and Carl fight, Stacie is upset by the photos, and Lewis' team wins the game.

George leaves for his new job, but ultimately chooses to return with Lewis instead. He renews his relationship with Stacie, who has broken off her engagement with Matt, and becomes a local sportscaster in Virginia.

== Cast ==
- Gerard Butler as George Dryer
- Jessica Biel as Stacie Dryer
- Uma Thurman as Patti King
- Catherine Zeta-Jones as Denise
- Dennis Quaid as Carl King
- Judy Greer as Barb
- James Tupper as Matt
- Noah Lomax as Lewis

== Production ==
The project began as a baseball story called "Confessions of a Little League Coach" but was later changed to soccer. Gerard Butler was confirmed to star in the film on February 23, 2011. On May 7, 2011, a casting call was held for extras to appear in the film. Filming began during the week of April 5, 2011.

On July 16, 2012, FilmDistrict changed the title from "Playing the Field" to "Playing for Keeps".

Director Muccino later blamed the film’s muddled focus on having thirteen producers, "each wanting a different movie", and also on bad marketing.

== Reception ==
On Rotten Tomatoes, the film has an approval rating of 6% based on 89 reviews, with an average rating of 3.6/10. The website's critical consensus reads, "Witless, unfocused and arguably misogynistic, Playing for Keeps is a dispiriting, lowest-common-denominator Hollywood rom-com." On Metacritic, the film has a weighted average score of 27 out of 100, based on 25 critics, indicating "generally unfavorable reviews". Audiences polled by CinemaScore gave the film an average grade of "B+" on an A+ to F scale.

Roger Ebert of the Chicago Sun-Times gave the film two out of four stars, and praised Biel for her performance: "Jessica Biel all but steals the show as Stacie". Justin Chang of Variety wrote: "A modestly affecting reconciliation drama wrapped in a so-so sports movie by way of a misogynistic romantic comedy, Playing for Keeps can't stop tripping all over itself." Peter Travers of Rolling Stone magazine panned the film and said "Just stay away. It's awful." Writing for The New York Times, Laura Kern listed it as the "Worst Film of 2012".

=== Accolades ===
At the 33rd Golden Raspberry Awards, Jessica Biel was nominated in the Worst Supporting Actress category.

== See also ==
- List of association football films
