= Secret Society of Second-Born Royals =

2020 film by Anna Mastro

- Promotional poster
- Directed by: Anna Mastro
- Screenplay by: Alex Litvak; Andrew Green
- Story by: Alex Litvak; Andrew Green; Austin Winsberg
- Produced by: Zanne Devine; Mike Karz; Austin Winsberg
- Starring: Peyton Elizabeth Lee; Niles Fitch; Isabella Blake-Thomas; Olivia Deeble; Noah Lomax; Faly Rakotohavana; Ashley Liao; Sam Page; Greg Bryk; Elodie Yung; Skylar Astin
- Cinematography: Jaron Presant
- Edited by: Evan Ahlgren
- Music by: Leo Birenberg
- Production companies: Gulfstream Pictures; Maple Plus Productions Inc.; Disney Channel
- Distributed by: Disney+
- Release date: September 25, 2020 (United States)
- Running time: 99 minutes
- Country: United States
- Language: English
- Budget: $35 million

Secret Society of Second-Born Royals is a 2020 American science fantasy superhero film directed by Anna Mastro from a screenplay by Alex Litvak and Andrew Green, based on a story by Litvak, Green, and Austin Winsberg. Zanne Devine, Mike Karz and Winsberg serve as producers. The film stars Peyton Elizabeth Lee, Niles Fitch, Isabella Blake-Thomas, Olivia Deeble, Noah Lomax, Faly Rakotohavana, Ashley Liao, Sam Page, Greg Bryk, Élodie Yung, and Skylar Astin, and was produced in association with Disney Channel. The film received mixed reviews from critics, with some finding it to be a cliché Disney Channel Original Movie.

The film was released on Disney+ on September 25, 2020.

== Plot ==
In the kingdom of Illyria, second-born royal Princess Samantha "Sam" argues against the monarchy with her friend, Mike, by performing rock music on the streets. Her older sister, Crown Princess Eleanor, is to succeed their mother, Regent Catherine, to the throne following the death of their father and uncle. While spending the night out with Mike, Sam suddenly begins to experience an over-stimulation of her senses while at an underground concert and gets herself and Mike arrested when she sets off the fire sprinklers. The next day, she is informed by Catherine that she is to take summer school to make up for missing her history test.

Sam attends summer school alongside eagerly friendly January, quiet and socially awkward Matteo, conceited and popular Tuma and social networking and pompous Roxana. Their teacher is Professor James Morrow who reveals that they are not there to take summer school, but instead are to be trained to join the Secret Society of Second-Born Royals, a group of superpowered individuals dedicated to protecting the world and serving the various monarchies. Morrow reveals that he has the ability to multiply himself and that Catherine is a member as well, shocking Sam. Catherine tells her that her sister Eleanor is to never know about the Society and Morrow immediately puts them to training.

Sam discovers that her heightened senses are the result of her powers awakening. Roxana learns that she can turn invisible, Tuma has mental persuasion, January can take other abilities temporarily and Matteo can control bugs. As they hone their powers, they become closer and begin opening up with Tuma admitting that his powers have resulted in him becoming conceited, Matteo feeling that he has a place where he belongs after feeling ignored, Roxana realizing that there is more beyond having numerous followers and January revealing that she has a twin brother who she feels pressured by due to him being seconds older than her. Meanwhile, a prisoner named Inmate 34 escapes and unleashes his telekinetic abilities.

After a failed simulation results in Sam missing a gig with Mike, she hangs out with her new friends to cheer her up and prepare for the upcoming coronation. Mike catches Sam hanging out with January and believes that she has abandoned him. Afterwards, Inmate 34 attacks the group and Sam gives chase when she hears him call her "Snowflake," a name only her father called her. A chase in the woods results in Morrow getting severely beaten, but January rescues Sam by taking Inmate 34's powers away. Morrow is hospitalized and Sam demands to see Inmate 34 from Catherine; discovering that he is in fact Edmond, her uncle. He reveals that he killed his brother because he wanted to take down the monarchy and have the people of Illyria be citizens rather than subjects. Sam begins to reevaluate her relationship with Eleanor when it becomes clear that she wants Sam to feel free.

The rest of the Society agree to be there for Sam at Eleanor's coronation. However, on the day, January is revealed to be in league with Edmond, who takes Tuma's powers and releases him. She wants Edmond to kill her brother so that she can take the throne to her kingdom. Matteo manages to send a bee to warn Sam and she recruits Mike, while also apologizing and revealing her secret. Sam and Mike manage to take out January and regroup with the rest of the Society to stop Edmond, who plans on using a device that will take out everyone with royal blood. The Society confront him and battle him before trapping him in an experimental miniaturized chamber. The coronation happens with no one aware of the events.

Sam, Matteo, Roxana and Tuma are inducted into the Society as Morrow recovers from his injuries. Catherine reveals the Society to Eleanor, who promises that her first order as queen will be to add parliament to their government. January has escaped and is now daring the Society to come and find her, and they leave by jet on their next mission.

== Cast ==
- Peyton Elizabeth Lee as Princess "Sam" Samantha, Eleanor's younger sister
  - Julianna Marie Neo as 5-year-old Sam
- Niles Fitch as Prince Tuma
- Isabella Blake-Thomas as Princess January
- Olivia Deeble as Princess Roxana
- Noah Lomax as Mike Kleinberg, Sam's best friend
- Faly Rakotohavana as Prince Matteo
- Ashley Liao as Crown Princess Eleanor, Sam's elder sister
  - Jessica Du as 8-year-old Eleanor
- Sam Page as King Robert, Sam's father
- Skylar Astin as Professor James Morrow
- Élodie Yung as Queen Regent Catherine, Sam's mother
- Greg Bryk as Inmate 34 / Prince / Uncle Edmond, Sam's uncle
- Carlos Gonzalez-Vio as Mike's Dad
- Sofia Pernas as Princess Anna

== Production ==
In May 2019, it was reported that Secret Society of Second-Born Royals was in development for Disney+ with executive producers Austin Winsberg and Mike Karz, directed by Anna Mastro, and written by Alex Litvak and Andrew Green. By May, Zanne Devine and Juliana Janes signed on as executive producer and co-producer, respectively. The script is based on an original story by Litvak, Green, and Winsberg. Élodie Yung revealed on later that month that she had been cast in the film. The cast was later announced with Peyton Elizabeth Lee in the lead role. Greg Bryk was announced to co-star as the film's primary antagonist.

Principal photography took place in Toronto, Ontario at University of Toronto from May 6 to June 29, 2019.

== Release ==
Secret Society of Second-Born Royals was released on September 25, 2020, exclusively on Disney+. It was previously scheduled to be released on Disney+ on July 17, 2020.

The film made its linear premiere on February 26, 2023 on Disney Channel in the United States.

== Reception ==
=== Critical response ===
On review aggregator website Rotten Tomatoes, the film holds an approval rating of 57% based on 30 critic reviews, with an average rating of 5.2/10. The site's critics consensus reads: "Secret Society of Second-Born Royals holds up just well enough to suffice as a streaming diversion -- which may be all its target demographic is looking for." Metacritic reports a score of 34 out of 100 based on seven critic reviews, indicating "generally unfavorable reviews".

Brian Lowry of CNN complimented the humor of the film and the story, writing, "Disney actually has a promising teen-driven movie indebted to the X-Men franchise. [...] Second-Born Royals also has the potential to become an ongoing franchise, meaning it wouldn't be a surprise to see this society suit up again, the same way that Descendants or High School Musical did." Petrana Radulovic of Polygon found the movie fun and entertaining, praised the movie for depicting characters with distinct personalities and different superpowers, but said the film lacks an emotional core across the relationships of the characters, stating, "Secret Society of Second-Born Royals’ many relationships feel rushed, simply because they are so separated and spread out. The movie is a fun time, an exciting showcase of superpowers and high-stakes action, but it also could be so much more."

Molly Freeman of Screen Rant rated the film 3 out of 5 stars, complimented the humor of the movie and the performances of the cast members, writing, "Secret Society of Second-Born Royals is pure family-friendly fun, combining princesses and superheroes for a delightful, if unoriginal, adventure. In the end, Secret Society of Second-Born Royals is fun for the whole family, with enough Disney magic to tide over fans of the Mouse House at a time when there's a dearth of new movies from the studio." Jennifer Green of Common Sense Media rated the movie 3 out of 5 stars, praised the presence of positive messages and models, saying, "The teens learn about teamwork, friendship, and the value of traditions -- and also about betrayal and people who are willing to kill for their own purposes. There are some positive messages here that could hit home with younger viewers, including teen characters needing to master their own insecurities and learning to care about other people and spend less time online." Sunayana Suresh of The Times of India gave the film a 2.5 out of 5 stars rating, complimented the premise and the performances of the actors, but found the movie lacks a thrilling narrative depiste having the potential to build a franchise.

Brooke Bajgrowicz of Mashable called the movie an X-Men knockoff, saying that the characters are undeveloped and unlikable across the film, and stating the film does not have a budget high enough to provide compelling special effects, while criticizing the plot. Josh Bell of CBR.com called Secret Society of Second-Born Royals a knock-off version of the X-Men, saying the film recalls Disney Channel original movies due to its budget compared to high-budget superhero productions released in movie theaters, and claimed it would have worked better as a TV series in order to develop the characters sufficiently.

=== Accolades ===
Year	Award	Category	Recipient(s)	Result	Ref.
2021	Critics' Choice Super Awards	Best Superhero Movie	Secret Society of Second-Born Royals	Nominated	
2021	Critics' Choice Super Awards	Best Actress in a Superhero Movie	Peyton Elizabeth Lee	Nominated	
2021	Critics' Choice Super Awards	Best Actor in a Superhero Movie	Skylar Astin	Nominated	
