= Loveboat, Taipei =

2020 young adult romance novel by Abigail Hing Wen

- Author: Abigail Hing Wen
- Cover artist: Janice Sung and Jennet Liaw
- Language: English
- Genre: Young adult
- Publisher: Simon & Schuster
- Publication date: January 7, 2020
- Publication place: United States
- Media type: Print (hardback, paperback)
- Pages: 432
- ISBN: 978-1-4711-9285-2
- Followed by: Loveboat Reunion

Loveboat, Taipei is a 2020 young adult romance novel by American author Abigail Hing Wen first published by HarperCollins and released on January 7, 2020. Wen captures the journey of self-discovery in her debut novel which was inspired by her time in Love Boat to learn Mandarin and more about her heritage. The novel was followed by two sequels, Loveboat Reunion, released on January 25, 2022, and Loveboat Forever, released on November 7, 2023.

A film adaptation of the book, retitled Love in Taipei was released on Paramount+ on August 10, 2023.

== Plot ==
Ever Wong, an eighteen-year old girl living in Ohio, has just graduated high school and been accepted to the medical program at Northwestern University, following the wishes of her immigrant parents, who gave up her father's career as a doctor in China to immigrate to America. However, she secretly harbors a passion for dance, and is conflicted when she is unexpectedly accepted to the dance program at the NYU Tisch School of the Arts, where she had applied on a whim without her parents' knowledge.

Ever's parents are furious and force her to decline the offer, and tell her they are sending her to summer school in Taiwan to connect with her culture. Upon arriving in Taipei, Ever meets her classmates, including Rick Woo, whom she finds attractive but reflexively dislikes, as he is a nationally famous Yale-bound prodigy child whom she is frequently compared to by her parents. Rick's cousin Sophie Ha, however, immediately takes a liking to Ever, and the two are assigned as roommates and quickly become friends.

Sophie excitedly tells Ever about the program's reputation for promiscuity and fostering romantic connections (hence its nickname, "Loveboat"), and Sophie sets her eyes on Xavier Yeh, a brooding, enigmatic playboy and the scion of one of Taiwan's wealthiest families. Meanwhile, Ever resolves to spend her first summer away from her parents breaking the constraining "Wong Rules" that her parents have imposed on her throughout her life.

One night, Ever and her classmates sneak out to a nightclub, and Ever gets drunk for the first time and dances with Xavier. Not knowing her limits, Ever becomes overly intoxicated until she vomits, and has to be helped home by Rick, who watches over her as she sobers up. The next morning, she finds a mysterious drawing of herself dancing at the club.

Ever sets off with Sophie to a photography studio to take glamour shots, and on the way there, Sophie confides that she went home with Xavier and hooked up with him the previous night. At the studio, Ever is annoyed by Sophie's comments about her conservative outfit choices, and decides to do her last shot completely nude. After the photoshoot, Ever seeks out an independent dance studio and signs up, having been barred by her parents from taking Loveboat's official dance electives.

Ever begins to warm up to Rick, grateful for his care after her drunken night at the club. Ever finds more drawings of herself slipped under her door; Rick denies being the author of the drawings, as he has a girlfriend, Jenna, back home in New Jersey, but tells Ever that he sees her as a sister and offers to help her find the mystery artist.

Sophie and Rick's aunt invites them on a weekend trip to visit her home in Taipei, and Sophie invites Xavier, who she is now dating, as well as Ever. Just before the trip, Ever is shocked to discover that Xavier is her mystery artist, and that he has mixed feelings towards Sophie. Out of loyalty to Sophie, Ever angrily warns Xavier to stop making drawings of her.

Ever agrees to pose as Rick's new girlfriend for the stay at his aunt's house in order to appease his family, who disapprove of Jenna, as she places large demands on Rick due to her dependency on him stemming from her depression. Sophie and Rick's family warmly welcome both Ever and Xavier. Over the weekend, Rick and Ever flirt, and Ever begins to develop feelings for Rick. Frustrated that she and Rick are only pretending, Ever gets drunk with Xavier, who confides to her that his father abuses him for being dyslexic, and tells her he sent her a silk rug that Sophie claimed for herself. Ever and Xavier kiss, just as a furious Sophie enters the room and sees them.

Ever hurries to an audition for Swan Lake, only to find that Sophie sabotaged her by giving out her nude photo and getting her kicked out of the studio. Ever returns to the Loveboat campus, and discovers the head teacher has one of her nudes as well, as do many of the boys in her class. Ever loudly calls out Sophie and shames the boys into giving her photos back. Rick departs campus to see Jenna, who has flown to meet him after finding out about his pretend-relationship with Ever. Believing she will be expelled the next day and that she will never see Rick or Xavier again, Ever sleeps with Xavier, to whom she loses her virginity. Ever then finds out her parents cannot afford to change her return flight, so she will stay for the rest of the summer after all. Conflicted about her feelings, Ever awkwardly avoids Xavier.

Ever determines to make up for her canceled audition by choreographing and dancing a show with several of her classmates for the Loveboat talent show, scheduled for the last night of the summer. Ever and Sophie reconcile after Sophie apologizes and admits that she is boy-crazy due to being under immense pressure to find a suitable, wealthy match. Rick returns and tells Ever that he has broken up with Jenna, confesses that he reciprocates her feelings, and kisses her. Ever invites both Sophie and Rick to join her talent show dance.

On a field trip to the south of Taiwan, Ever and Rick reaffirm their feelings for each other and sleep together; Xavier is pained by Ever's choice, but accepts her decision. During the trip, a typhoon strikes Taitung and floods the home village of one of Loveboat's counselors. The students resolve to make the talent show a benefit performance for the destroyed village, with the help of Sophie, who uses her family connections to have the talent show staged at Taiwan's National Theater. Ever and Sophie invite Xavier to auction his artwork at the show as part of the charity drive, and he accepts. Jenna suddenly arrives, having come to find Rick, and out of concern, he escorts her back to Taipei, promising Ever that he will show up in time for their dance.

On the night of the show, Ever is anxiously awaiting Rick's arrival when she finds out that her dad has just arrived in Taipei, preparing to fly home with her the next day. Ever meets him outside the theater, where he excitedly steps towards her into the path of an oncoming car. Ever pushes him to safety, but hurts her ankle in the process. Ever refuses to let this stop her from performing, and she invites her dad to witness firsthand how much she loves to dance.

Rick arrives just in time and tells Ever that Jenna has finally accepted their breakup. During the dance finale, Ever slips on her injured ankle, but Rick catches her, and the dance and talent show overall are a huge success. Xavier sells every artwork he brings to the show, and along with ticket sales, the students raise $16,000.

Ever returns home to Ohio, where she informs her parents that she withdrew her admission to Northwestern, and plans to reapply for dance programs the next fall. Ever's mother still disapproves, but Ever senses tacit support from her dad, after having seen her talent show performance. Northwestern's medical program instead accepts Jenna from the waitlist, seemingly affirming an earlier conversation among the Loveboat students speculating that American universities see Asians as interchangeable. Xavier decides to work at a theatre in Los Angeles, while Sophie heads off to Dartmouth. Ever and Rick are now officially dating, and she promises to visit him at Yale.

== Reception ==
In 2019, Loveboat, Taipei, Wen's debut novel, sold in a multi-house auction to HarperCollins, for a two-book deal. It debuted at #9 on the New York Times Bestseller List where it remained for multiple weeks. Loveboat, Taipei was published on January 7, 2020, by HarperTeen. Wen and Loveboat, Taipei have been featured in NBC Bay Area Show, World Journal, the South China Morning Post, Cosmopolitan, and People en Español. The novel appeared on a number of Most Anticipated lists including The Boston Globe, Book Riot, Bustle, BuzzFeed, The UK Evening Standard, The Nerd Daily, Seventeen, and She Reads. Loveboat, Taipei was selected as a Barnes & Noble Young Adult Book Club Pick and it appeared at number 1 on Cosmopolitan's 25 Best Audiobooks of 2020 list.

The book additionally received reviews from Booklist, Kirkus, Common Sense Media, and Asian Pacific American Librarians Association.
