= Noah Lomax =

American actor (born 2001)

- Born: November 7, 2001 (age 24); New Orleans, Louisiana, U.S.
- Occupation: Actor
- Years active: 2009–present

Noah Lomax (born November 7, 2001) is an American actor. Among his prominent roles are: Lewis in the film Playing for Keeps, Josh in the film Safe Haven, and Louis Morales in the TV series The Walking Dead.

== Early life and education ==
Lomax was born in New Orleans, Louisiana. He has resided in Atlanta since age five. His older sister, Maddie, is also an actress, and the two have performed at least three times onscreen together.

== Career ==
Lomax has worked on numerous television commercials. His first success in acting was in a 2009 episode of the TV series Army Wives. Since then he has appeared on other TV series, including Drop Dead Diva, The Middle, Mad Love, and Bones.

An early uncredited role for Lomax was playing the minor role of Louis Morales in a few episodes of The Walking Dead. His older sister, Maddie Lomax, plays Louis's older sister, Eliza. In 2012, he landed his first starring role in the film by Gabriele Muccino, Playing for Keeps. In 2013, he played the role of Josh in the film based on the Nicholas Sparks novel Safe Haven.

On January 6, 2014, Lomax joined the cast of the film 99 Homes to play Connor Nash, Andrew Garfield's character's son.

In The SpongeBob Movie: Sponge Out of Water (2015), Lomax played the role of Mikey.

== Filmography ==
Year	Title	Role	Notes
2009	Army Wives	Byron Dunwood	Episode: "First Response"
2010	The Wizard of Agni	Munchkin Roberto	Short
2010	Drop Dead Diva	Noah Porter	Episode: "Back from the Dead"
2010	The Walking Dead	Louis Morales	Episodes: "Tell It to the Frogs", "Vatos", "Wildfire" (uncredited)
2011	The Middle	8-Year-Old Axl	Episode: "The Legacy"
2011	Mad Love	Jake	Episode: "The Secret Life of Larry"
2012	Playing for Keeps	Lewis	
2013	Safe Haven	Josh	
2014	99 Homes	Connor Nash	
2015	The SpongeBob Movie: Sponge Out of Water	Mikey (voice)	
2016	Brave New Jersey	Peter	
2018	Tybee	Maxx	Short
2020	Secret Society of Second-Born Royals	Mike Kleinberg	Disney+ film
2023	The Man in the White Van	Mark	
