= Love Boat (study tour) =

Summer program run by the government of Taiwan for overseas Taiwanese/Chinese youth

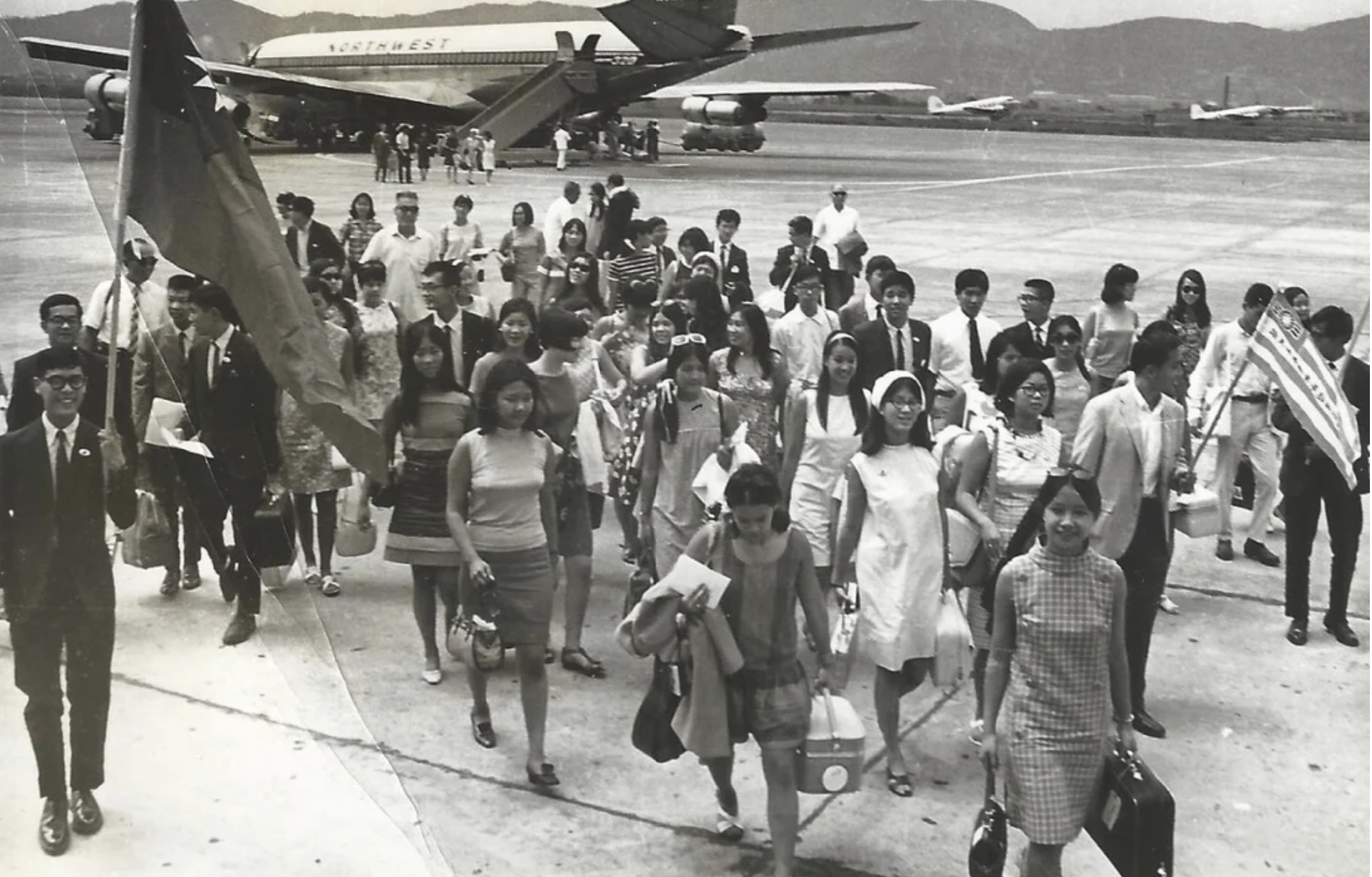
American and Canadian students arriving by plane to Taiwan in 1967 to attend the first Overseas Chinese Youth Language Training and Study Tour (currently named Overseas Compatriot Youth Taiwan Study Tour), informally known as The Love Boat. Photo permission provided by the Chinese Canadian Archive.

The Overseas Compatriot Youth Taiwan Study Tour to Taiwan, informally known as the Love Boat, is currently a three-week summer program for about 70 to 100 College-aged Overseas Chinese and Overseas Taiwanese. In Chinese it is also colloquially referred to as Měi-Jiā-yíng (美加營) – “America and Canada Camp” – a reference to the origin of most participants. The program is held at the Chientan Youth Activity Center (劍潭) in Taipei, which is not to be confused with Jiantan subway station.

== Origins of the Study Tour ==
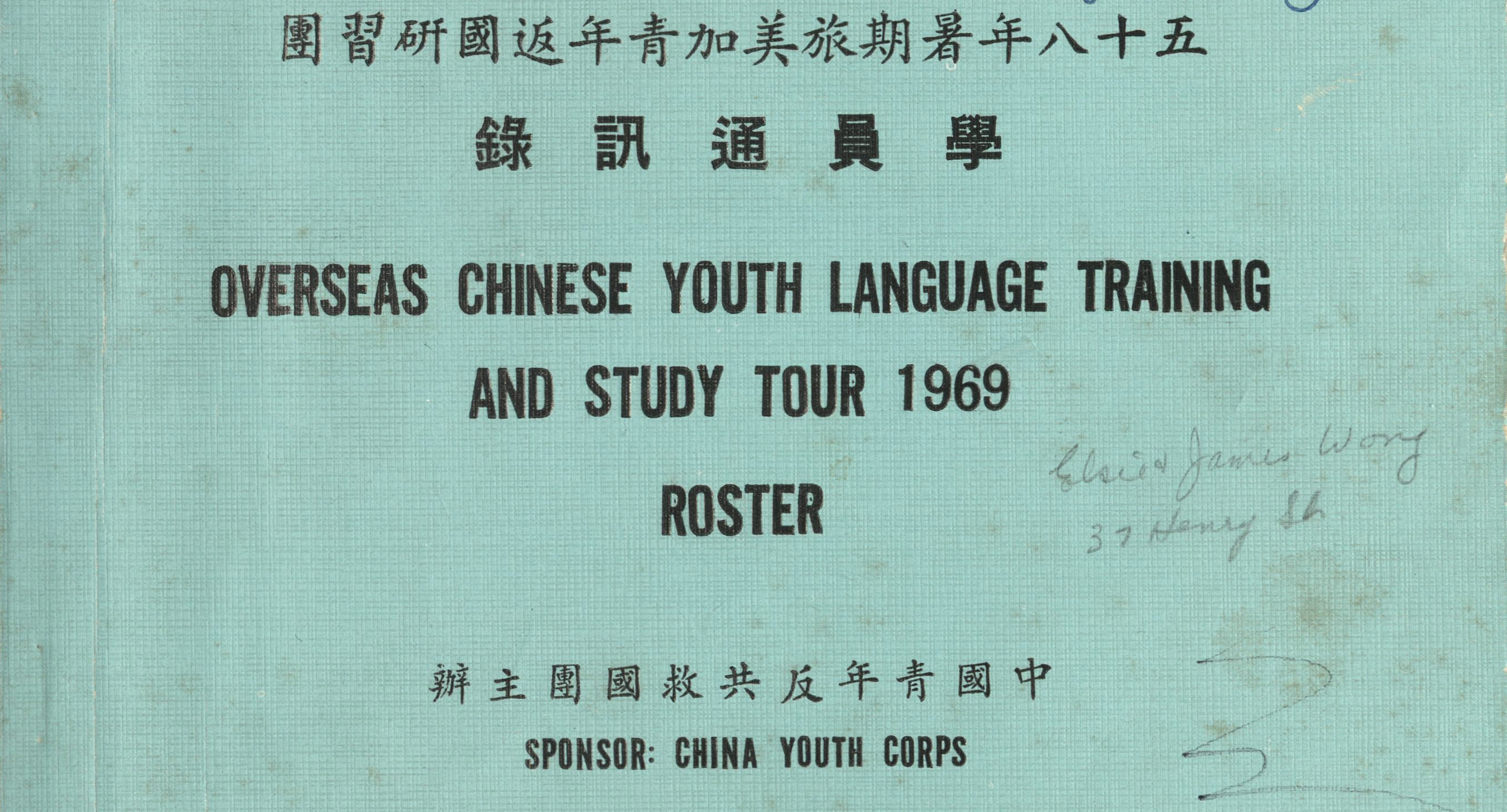
Cover of the 1969 Roster Book of the Overseas Chinese Youth Language Training and Study Tour. This would in later years be turned into the annual Study Tour Yearbook. Photo Permission provided by the Chinese Canadian Archive.

The Study Tour program was started in 1967 by the China Youth Corps. According to the Chinese Canadian Archive, the original name of the program was the "Overseas Chinese Youth Language Training and Study Tour" and was initially promoted across North America through various local Chinese newspapers by Chinese North Americans with relations to the Kuomintang party. The primary goal of the program was to acquaint, or re-acquaint, young people of Chinese descent living in other parts of the world with Chinese culture and language. Thus, participants take brief courses in language and arts, attend lectures, and take scenic tours of Taiwan.

This however, is the popular perception of the program. The alternate and original purpose for the Taiwan Government's subsidizing of the program was to shore up Overseas Chinese support for its cross-strait political policies, particularly those of the Kuomintang (KMT) party in regards to its tense relations with China. Accordingly, participants were to attend lectures on cross-strait relations which others might perceive as propaganda. The program was conceived by the Taiwan Government in part because the Kuomintang for many decades had recognized the historical importance of the Overseas Chinese community not only for its financing but also for its political support. In fact Dr. Sun Yat-Sen, the founder of the Kuomintang as well as the Republic of China (1912–1949), recognized early the importance of Overseas Chinese support and went as far as to say that "Overseas Chinese are the Mother of the Revolution." However, beyond the political origins of the Study Tour, the program is most famous for its historically positive influence on Chinese American identity in addition to its "Loveboat" reputation of spawning many relationships as well as hosting a frenetic nightlife scene which many participants indulged in.

== Changes from 1967 to 1999 ==
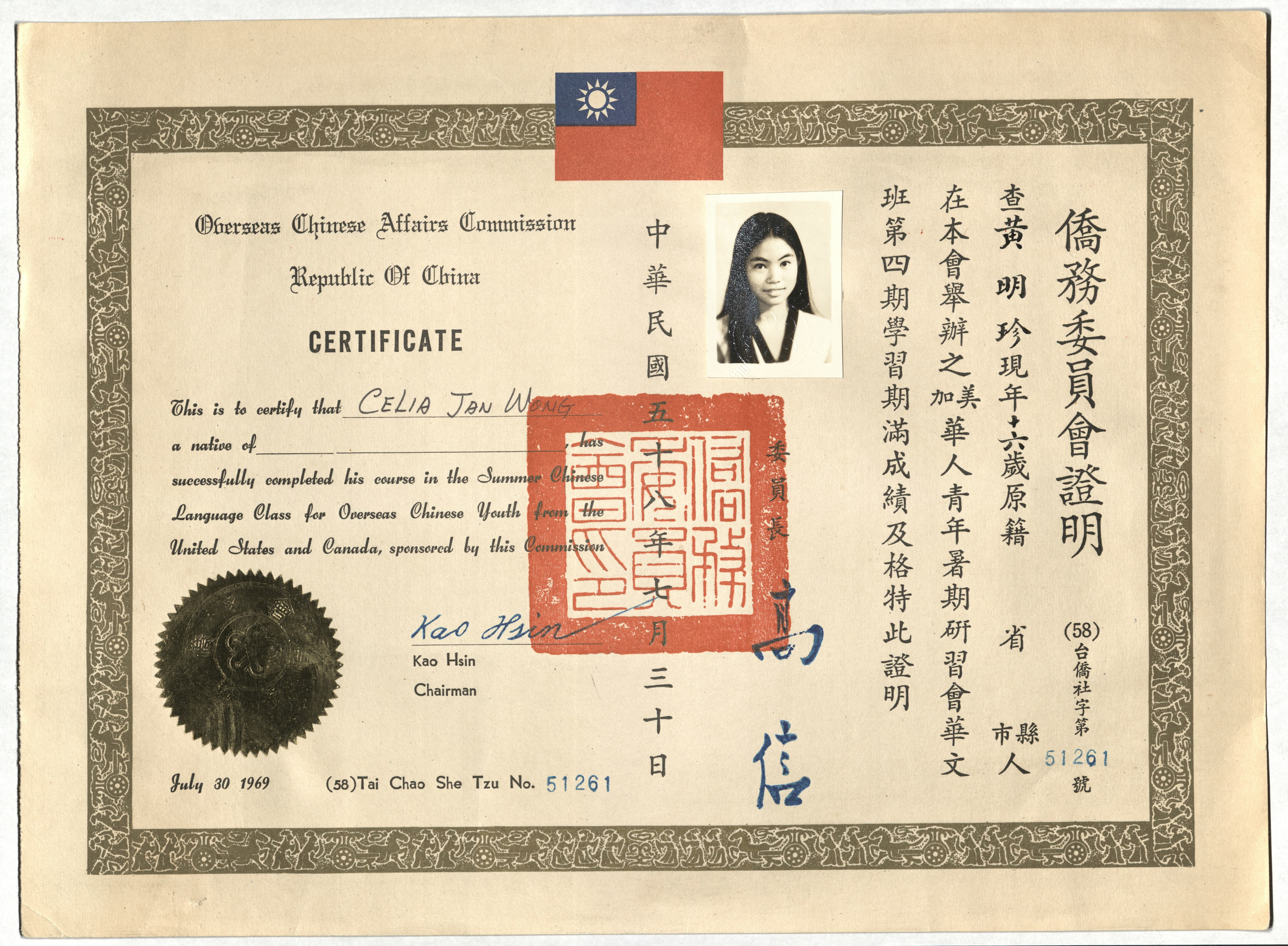
Official 1969 Certificate of attendance for the Overseas Chinese Youth Language Training and Study Tour. Photo permission provided by Jan Wong and the Chinese Canadian Archive

The Study Tour has gone through many changes over the years which correspond with Taiwan's changing politics and economy. After an experimental trial run in 1966 of only 5 students from North America, the China Youth Corps conducted the first official Study Tour in 1967 which hosted 70-100 participants from America and Canada, with an age range of between 14 and 25. According to journalist Jan Wong, a 1969 Study Tour participant, the first few years of the Study Tour program were held at Fu Jen Catholic University. As the popularity of the program grew, the number of participants increased and the headquarters moved to the Chientan Youth Activity Center in the 1970s located in the Shilin District near modern day Jiantan station.

It was during this time, the China Youth Corps had changed the name of the Study Tour to "Overseas Chinese Youth Language Training and Study Tour to the Republic of China," to be more in line with their political ideology. By the 1970s and 1980s, the average size of the program slowly grew to 300–500 students up until 1988 and then in 1989 peaked exponentially at 1,200 participants. Due to the overwhelming increase in demand participants had to be placed in three separate campuses in the 1980s - one at the Chientan Campus and the other new one held at Taipei's Tam Kang Campus and a third at Tung-Hai University in TaiChung. During this time, and due to the increase in student numbers, the China Youth Corps came to share sponsoring responsibilities with the Overseas Chinese Affairs Commission, which has since been renamed the Overseas Community Affairs Council.

This increase in enrollment coincided with both Taiwan's 1987 lifting of martial law and also its astronomical economic rise in the technology boom which greatly increased the island's reputation and prosperity. Further, because many originally skeptical participants were returning home with a greater appreciation of Taiwanese culture and improved Chinese language skills, and were raving about the quality of the Tour to their family, this consequently led to good word of mouth about the program being spread within the international Chinese community.

This was especially pertinent in the 1970s and 1980s when Chinese communities were smaller than present day and a clear sense of "Asian American identity" for many North American born Chinese was nebulous at best. Many American-born Chinese who initially did not have any Chinese language skills and who refused to date a fellow Asian, returned from the Tour not only expressing a greater appreciation of Chinese language and culture but also a greater willingness to date within the Asian community. There were many reasons for this, but especially for those participants who came from communities without many Chinese, the Study Tour provided a unique forum to share their common "Chinese North American Experience" of growing up and needing to reconcile both North American and Asian Cultures in a predominantly Caucasian society.

This bonding not only produced several relationships but it also created many lifelong friendships. In addition, it did not hurt that during the trip, students were treated as "little diplomats." This was witnessed during their police escorted bus trips to local Taipei landmarks where local traffic was essentially stopped for the convenience of their journey and to the relative chagrin of local Taiwanese commuters. This same sense of diplomacy was bestowed upon them at various military installations and cultural performances that students attended and were attempts by the program to ingratiate students with the people and culture of Taiwan. These various aspects of the Study Tour combined with the fact that 6 weeks of room and board (excluding airfare) only cost the participant less than $500 US dollars, due to Taiwan government subsidization, also led to increased popularity for the trip, as most agreed it was an excellent deal.

However, a by-product of the Study Tour's increased popularity was increased competition by parents to register their children especially at large urban centers in New York and California. In fact, there were often waiting lists to get on the program and for some parents getting their child on the program became a symbol of status and often pertinent or high-ranking connections facilitated the application process for their child. Some parents, desiring their children to find a "suitable Chinese spouse", sent their unsuspecting children on the trip while telling them it was chiefly a Language Study Tour. Conversely, some students who were interested in attending would often neglect to inform their parents about the Study Tour's Love Boat reputation for fear of not being allowed to go. These concerns by some parents came from rumors that a few participants engaged in sexually promiscuous activity. On the other side of the spectrum, several Study Tour attendees did happen to fall in love and end up marrying each other. All these instances led to the Study Tour gaining its Love Boat nickname and reputation. Several unplanned pregnancies were however documented on the 1996 Study Tour resulted in more stringent rules for subsequent tours; including rules against the opposite sex being present in the same dorm room and more strictly administered curfews.

The job of implementing these many rules has traditionally been overseen by many local college-aged Taiwan counselors whose responsibilities, from early morning to late at night, consisted of organizing all the various logistics of the students' itinerary. This included organizing language/cultural classes, outings, speech contests, meals, medical care, guest speakers, and enforcing discipline which included trying to prevent (in vain) the students from sneaking out of the campus in the evening to enjoy the Taipei nightlife. Due to the sheer volume of minor misdeeds many counselors had to turn a blind eye and instead focused their energies on ensuring the safety and well being of the students. Becoming a Study Tour counselor for local Taiwanese was considered by many a badge of honour, as throughout the 1960s to the 1990s, the China Youth Corps only accepted local Taiwan applicants from the best Taiwan universities and degree programs in a rigorous selection process. For many counselors, the Study Tour was their very first contact with Chinese from abroad and many found the cultural exchange as life-changing as did the students who attended.

Another prerequisite of the Study Tour by the 1980s had become mandatory university enrollment, with a preference for students in Ivy League universities and students in their final year of university and thus near the age limit. Students with high academic achievements such as Presidential Scholars, Rhodes Scholars, or Truman Scholars were also given higher priority and were able to attend the Study Tour without charge. Further rules stipulated that a family could only send one of its children at a time during any particular tour year so as to avoiding hoarding of spots by families. Exceptions were made however to twins and siblings from Europe. Participation had gradually increased from Europe, especially countries such as France, Germany, Sweden, Denmark, Austria, Switzerland, the Netherlands, and the UK. Countries such as Australia and those from South America and Africa also began sending small numbers of Study Tour participants. This contributed greatly to the sense of international community among Overseas Chinese worldwide.

By the 1990s, the Study Tour's official name was Overseas Chinese Youth Language Training and Study Tour to the Republic of China ( 海外莗裔靑年暑期返國硏習團 ). At this time, it had become a 6 week long program with an enrollment of 1200 participants aged from 18–23 with a management staff of over 80 Counselors. As the size of the program expanded, more cultural classes were added to the existing language class education schedule.

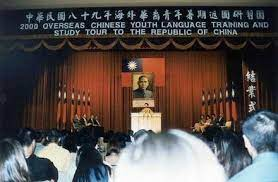
CYC Director Dr. Jeanne Li giving her final Closing Ceremony speech on the year 2000 Study Tour

These classes now included calligraphy, cooking, Chinese medicine, Chinese yo-yo, fan dancing, flute, kung-fu, painting, paper cutting, stick-fighting, southern fiddle, sword-fighting, Taiwanese aboriginal dance, ribbon dancing, zither, and several others. After 4 weeks of training, some students would perform what they learned during the "Closing Ceremony" in front of an audience of Study Tour participants and several high-level government officials at the Chientan Youth Activity Center auditorium. This Closing Ceremony preceded the famous "9 day trip down South" which took all 1,200 study tour participants, in 4 separate groups, on a bus tour around the entire island of Taiwan to see the major scenic areas. These scenic attractions included Taroko National Park, Sun Moon Lake, Kenting National Park, and Sanxiantai, among others. The end of the 9 day trip down South coincided with the end of the Study Tour and with all the students shortly returning, sometimes tearfully, to their countries of origin.

== Addition of Ocean Campus in 1992 ==
Starting in 1992, another memorable change occurred in the Study Tour in that Tam Kang Campus was replaced in use by Ocean Campus in Keelung. Many recall with fondness or revulsion the facilities of Ocean Campus. But by popular opinion, those students who were placed in Chientan Campus had the more comfortable facilities and the convenience to the nearby Shilin night market in Taipei. In comparison, those students at Ocean Campus experienced slightly less convenient facilities albeit theirs did include more athletic and outdoor activities but unfortunately were a good cab ride away from the Taipei nightlife. Without such amenities as Chientan campus, students at Ocean Campus often had no choice but to use their greater opportunities and free time at Ocean campus to communicate and bond. Unfortunately, the idea and logistics behind a Campus switch between Chientan and Ocean would not come to fruition until the Study tour of 1996. During this switch, participants at Ocean and Chientan would switch campuses half-way during the Tour. This type of switch would continue until the 2001 Study Tour.

== Death of student in 1993 and subsequent lawsuit ==
One other reason for stricter rules involved the death of a student. According to Valerie Soe's 2019 documentary "Loveboat Taiwan", in August 1993 during that year's "9 day trip down south", a participant went against the wishes of the counselors to swim in the bay of Kenting. The student was caught in an undertow and subsequently drowned while others were attempting to rescue him. His body was not found until it washed up several days later. This embroiled the Study tour in a multimillion-dollar lawsuit which lasted many years and ended in a settlement. Thus, stricter rules were created for the Study Tour overall not only for legal purposes but also for the protection of the students. Although complete enforcement is extremely difficult for the counselors of the Tour, students caught breaking major rules such as fighting, stealing, or sexual harassment are immediately sent home.

== Changes from 2000 to 2012 ==
The program maintained its number of participants and its program structure throughout the 1990s but this changed after the 1999 Jiji earthquake. As a result, many parents were hesitant of sending their children to Taiwan so that the number of participants in the year 2000 tour dropped to 800 as anyone who applied was accepted. Further problems for the Study tour continued. The Study Tour had historically been funded and supported by Taiwan's Kuomintang party since its inception in 1967. After the 2000 Taiwan election, the incoming change of administration of the Democratic Progressive Party (DPP) did not fully support the aims or goals of the Study Tour. As a result, funding was drastically cut for the CYC and enrollment for the tour of 2001 was limited to 800 students in a pattern of cost-cutting that continues to the present day. To cut costs, most students of that year were removed from the traditional Chientan building and moved to a smaller adjacent one that historically hosted the "Baby Boat", a much younger Study Tour, where participants were aged between 12–18. The cuts did not end there. In 2002, due to lack of government support, the China Youth Corps which usually ran the program announced that it could no longer support a sizable number of students at Chientan for its 2002 Study Tour and that other organizations would have to pick up the slack. As a result, in 2002 the Chientan campus hosted about 100 students with other tour participants going to three other different campuses; including one campus near the Taipei Zoo and another in Taichung. The fourth group was the most unusual as they did not have a specific or permanent home base and spent most of their trip traveling around the island by bus. This fourth group therefore, did not get nor require a "Trip down South." There was no campus switch for this 2002 Study tour and each group hosted approximately 100 members.

In the over 50 year history of the Taiwan Study Tour, the students have survived through many travails such as earthquakes, typhoons, localized disease outbreaks, and even missile threats/military posturing from China. However, no Study Tour year had ever been canceled due to these incidents until the 2003 year. In 2003, the worldwide coronavirus SARS outbreak caused the first ever cancellation of a Study Tour before it even began. Parents were hesitant to send their children to Taiwan at the time and Tour organizers recognized the logistical nightmare due to widespread quarantine conditions. Similarly, 17 years later, the Covid-19 coronavirus pandemic caused the only other documented cancellation of a Study Tour.

The Study Tour resumed in 2004 with two groups and a new official name of "Overseas Compatriot Youth Summer Formosa Study Tour." One group remained at Chientan Campus which in this year included more strictly enforced 11pm bed checks. Another group was located at Taichung. The enrollment slowly increased with Chientan campus eventually housing up to 200 Study tour students with the potential for greater expansion. Due to the insistence by the Democratic Progressive Party between 2005-2007 there was increased pressure on the Study Tour to offer language classes in Taiwanese. These changes did not last when the Kuomintang returned to power in 2008 and the traditional classes in Mandarin were again re-established.

== Changes to Chientan Campus ==
The Chientan Youth Activity Center has been a fixture in the Shilin District for decades since the China Youth Corps first acquired property rights to 65% of the land it sits on prior to 1988 with the remaining 35% being state owned in a relationship that was complex. In 2015, there were calls by Taipei City politicians to demolish and remove the Chientan Youth Activity Center and to replace it with an arts center and park. Complicated negotiations between the China Youth Corps and the Taipei City Government continued into September 2016 until finally coming to a compromise. Their agreement stipulated that by the end of 2024, all property rights to the Chientan Youth Activity Center would be transferred without compensation from the China Youth Corps to the Taipei City Government. According to the Taipei Public Works Department, "CYC currently pays the rent of Chientan Youth Activity Center on the state-owned property land, which is based on a 5% annual interest rate regulated in 'Rent Criteria of State-owned Property Land Ordinance' revised on April 1, 2018. Moreover, CYC is recognized as a public welfare group by the Ministry of the Interior. Its land for non-business use should be charged 60% while the rest for business purposes should be calculated at a 160% surcharge."

== Changes from 2013 to current program ==
The documentary "Loveboat Taiwan" further goes on to describe the dwindling number of students attending the Study Tour during the late 2000s up to the last larger-scale Study Tour year in 2013 which numbered at about 350 participants. The number of Study Tour attendees dropped drastically after that year and currently sits at around 70-100 students accepted each summer. Ironically, the current Study Tour being organized annually is similar in size to the very first Study Tour held in 1967 and is currently named "Overseas Compatriot Youth Taiwan Study Tour". It is now solely the Overseas Community Affairs Council (OCAC) of Taiwan and according to its official website the Study Tour is now only a 3 week long program with an age group of between 12 and 24 years old. It is also just one of the OCAC's many "expatriate" programs it runs for visiting international students in the summer and throughout the year. Due to the shorter period of time, language training is less stressed than in previous years and with comparatively less emphasis on cross-strait relations. With far fewer cultural classes offered as in past Study Tours due to the much smaller number of students, the current Tour focuses on introducing participants to Taiwan history, culture, landmarks, and also includes "participation in earth environmental activities and charitable activities" as described in the OCAC's application form. Participants also get the unique opportunity to visit the Office of the President of Taiwan, re-establishing the important historical link between Overseas Chinese and Taiwanese to Taiwan's goal of establishing greater international support and recognition.

Even though Chinese communities in North America now enjoy greater mainstream acceptance than they did over 50 years ago, and despite the fact modern Chinese North Americans youths may take associating with each other for granted as well as an unquestioned way of life, the goals and endeavours of the Taiwan Study Tour remain the same.

== In popular culture ==
The documentary Loveboat Taiwan by Valerie Soe was released in 2019 to film festivals internationally and to public acclaim, receiving several awards.

On January 7, 2020 Harper Collins published Abigail Hing Wen's debut novel, Loveboat, Taipei, which made the New York Times Top Ten best seller's list for Young Adult fiction. She has come out with two sequels to her original novel with "Loveboat Reunion" and "Loveboat Forever." The film adaption to her first book entitled "Love in Taipei" has been released on the Paramount Plus streaming service since August 10, 2023.

== Notable participants ==
- Arlene Chan, author and Canadian Chinatown historian
- Elaine Chao 趙小蘭, US Secretary of Transportation and wife of Mitch McConnell
- Ming Chen, reality TV star Comic Book Men
- John Cheng 鄭達志, physician, victim of Irvine Taiwanese Presbyterian Church shooting
- Daphne Chih 支藝樺 (former counselor), business executive, TV host, and author
- Judy Chu 趙美心, California Congresswoman
- Rose Chung, Founder of the Miss Asian Global Pageant and Board Chair of APA family services, Miss Chinatown USA 1981
- Mike Eng 伍國慶, former Californian mayor
- Roger Fan, actor
- Abigail Hing Wen 邢立美, author (New York Times Best-seller), attorney, and venture capitalist
- Jason Hsu Yu-jen 許毓仁 (former counselor), businessman, former Taiwan legislator, entrepreneur, and co-founder of TEDxTaipei
- Eddie Huang 黃頤銘, author, chef, and attorney
- Amy Hwang, New Yorker magazine cartoonist and architect
- Judy Lee, engineer and TV host (Emmy Award winner)
- Michael Lee, executive director of the Museum of Chinese in America
- Noel Lee (executive), founder and CEO of Monster Inc.
- Stacey Lee, author (New York Times best-seller), attorney
- Audrey Lee 李介芹, engineer, energy markets and policy expert, co-chair of Clean Energy for America
- Louisa Luk 陸依薩, Miss Chinese International Pageant 1998 winner, Miss Hong Kong 1998 Pageant winner
- Joanna Ng, professional figure skater, coach, "Pocahontas" in Walt Disney's World on Ice
- Kimmie Ng, medical oncologist, professor, cancer researcher (Dana-Farber Cancer Institute)
- Valerie Soe 蘇杏娟, professor, writer, and film director
- Anna Tsing 安清, anthropologist
- Justin Tan, video producer
- Garrett Wang 王以瞻, actor
- Jan Wong 黃明珍, journalist and author
- Kristina Wong 黄君儀, comedian, performance artist, and actor
- Michael Woo 胡紹基, college dean and politician
- Amy Yee, journalist
- Kaila Yu, import model and singer

== See also ==
- Birthright Israel – Analogous Israeli program for Jewish Diaspora youth
