= Love in Taipei =

American film directed by Arvin Chen

- Film poster
- Directed by: Arvin Chen
- Screenplay by: Charlie Oh; Mackenzie Dohr
- Based on: Loveboat, Taipei by Abigail Hing Wen
- Produced by: Matt Kaplan
- Starring: Ross Butler; Ashley Liao; Nico Hiraga; Chelsea Zhang; Cindy Cheung
- Cinematography: Jake Pollock
- Edited by: Michelle Harrison
- Music by: Roger Suen
- Production companies: ACE; Lionsgate; Paramount
- Distributed by: Paramount+
- Release dates: August 10, 2023; (United States and Canada)
- Running time: 95 minutes
- Country: United States
- Language: English

Love in Taipei is a 2023 American romantic comedy film directed by Arvin Chen, starring Ross Butler, Ashley Liao and Nico Hiraga. The film is based on Abigail Hing Wen's 2020 novel Loveboat, Taipei.

The film was released by Paramount+ on August 10, 2023.

== Plot ==
Ever Wong is a 21-year-old Taiwanese American college student from Chagrin, Ohio. A star student and dancer, she is currently studying premed. The summer before starting medical school, her parents decide to send her to a summer school program in Taipei called Huewei, so she can learn more about her culture and study Mandarin. At first, she is not happy to go, because she was planning on practicing for an audition for a dance program based in NYC, although she fears her parents would not approve.

When Ever arrives at Huwei, she is surprised to learn that many of the students tag the program as "Loveboat," as they see it as an opportunity to party and have a fun summer making new friends and relationships. She starts receiving sketches of herself from a secret admirer. Soon, Ever finds herself making fast friends with Sophie Ha, who happens to be the cousin of Rick "Wonder Boy" Woo, a popular Taiwanese American student studying economics at Yale who Ever's mother has been admiring for years.

Ever also finds she has earned the attention of another classmate, Xavier. Slowly, she starts breaking out of her shell and spends her time exploring the city and partying with Rick and Sophie. Also, Ever reconnects with her mother's sister Auntie Shu who lives in Taipei, and luckily owns a studio where she can practice her dance audition.

Things come to a head when Rick invites Ever as his date to a fancy family party in an attempt to save face after breaking up with his ex-girlfriend, whom his family approved of. He tries to boast about Ever's accomplishments as a medical student and her father being a successful doctor, when in reality he was a doctor in Taiwan prior to immigrating to the US but now works in a pharmacy. Ever is hurt by Rick's actions so abruptly leaves the party.

At the same time, Sophie dumps Xavier (who she had been dating) for embarrassing her in front of the family by sharing his plans to travel the country in a van. Xavier finds Ever after the party and they bond when they get caught in a typhoon on their way back to Huwei. He reveals he has been the one sending her the sketches, and they share a kiss.

Confused about her feelings, Ever runs back to campus alone to find the power is out. There, she finds Rick, who apologizes for his actions and confesses he cares for her. However, he also reveals he and Sophie will be leaving Taipei the following day due to the terrible floods.

The next day, Ever walks to her Auntie Shu's studio/apartment, which is ruined from the floods as she forgot to close the windows before hurrying to the school dance. She gets in touch with her parents after the floods, who share that they received news that she was rejected from the dance company. With some encouragement from Xavier, Ever starts moving forward. She has her friends help restore Auntie Shu's studio, as well as practices her Mandarin dancing for the upcoming Loveboat Street Festival (which is being held to celebrate artists work that had been damaged in the storm, as well as give the Huwei students the opportunity to showcase the culture and talents they had learned over the summer).

Ever's parents fly in for the festival that she has been working so hard on. Ever tells them she does not want to go to medical school and that she is still figuring out what she wants to do with her life. The festival is a success. Rick and Sophie reunite with Ever and they part on good terms. Ever and Xavier share a romantic moment and she reaffirms that she feels content with not knowing exactly where her life is going.

== Cast ==
- Ross Butler as Rick Woo
- Ashley Liao as Ever Wong
- Nico Hiraga as Xavier Yeh
- Chelsea Zhang as Sophie Ha
- Cindy Cheung as Aunt Shu
- Kelly Ko as The Dragon
- Janet Hsieh as Aunt Claire
- Elton Tang as Uncle David
- Jacko Chiang as Mr. Wong
- Alexia Kao as Mrs. Wong

== Release ==
Love in Taipei was released by Paramount+ on August 10, 2023, in the United States and Canada.

== Reception ==
On the review aggregator website Rotten Tomatoes, 68% of 19 critics' reviews are positive, with an average rating of 6/10.
