= China Youth Corps =

Youth organization in the Republic of China

China Youth Corps 中國靑年救國團
- Founded: October 31, 1952
- Headquarters: Number 219, Songjiang Street, Zhongshan District, Taipei, Taiwan
- Website: http://www.cyc.org.tw/

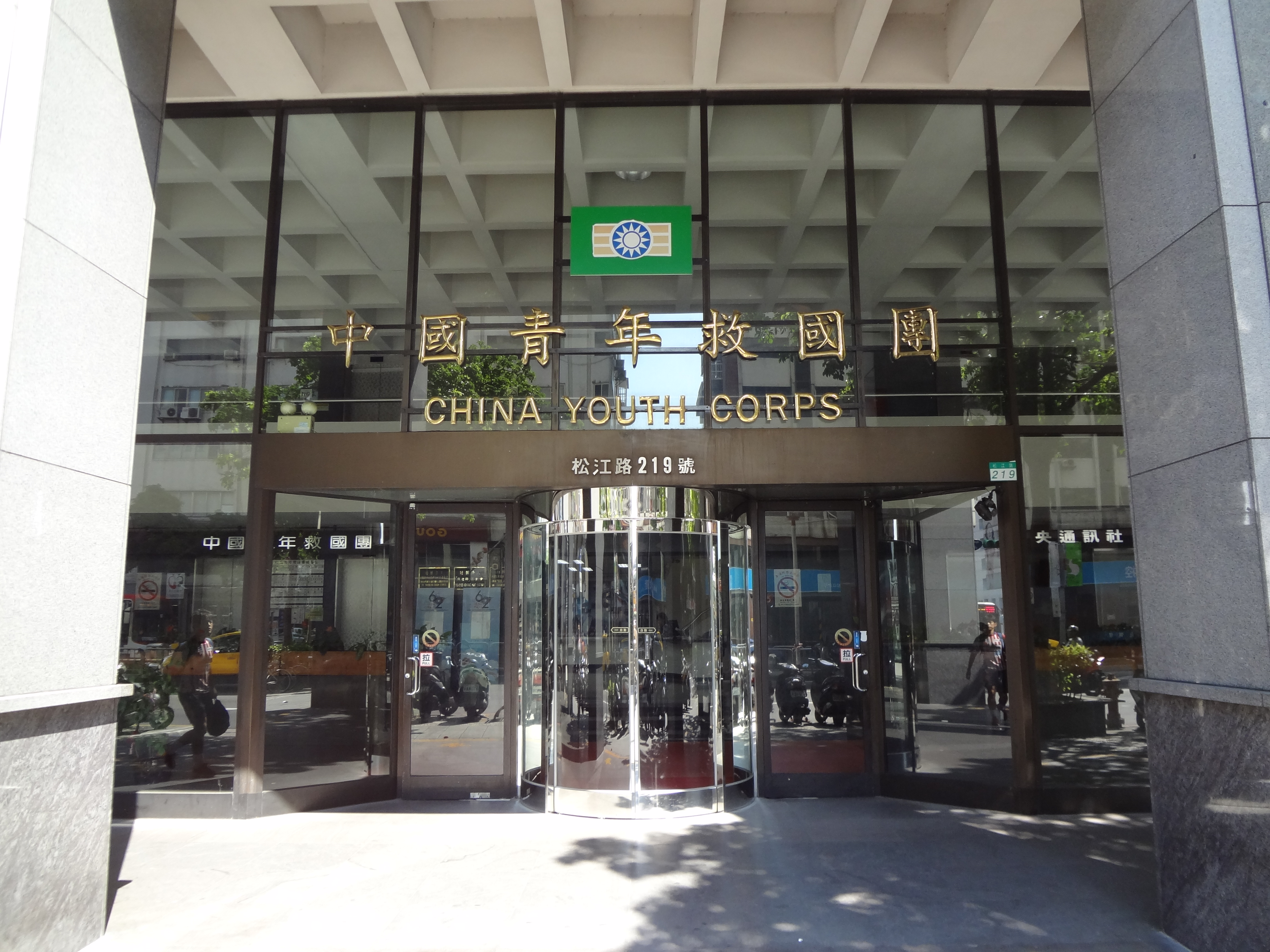
China Youth Corps

The China Youth Corps (中國青年救國團; 'China Youth National Salvation Corps'; until 2000: 中國青年反共救國團; 'China Youth Anti-Communist National Salvation Corps'), often known simply as CYC (救國團), is a youth organization in the Republic of China.

The CYC was established in 1952, on the recommendation of the then president Chiang Kai-shek; its first chairperson was his son Chiang Ching-kuo. The original purpose of the CYC was to provide basic military training to youths before they were conscripted into the Nationalist armed forces. At that time the CYC was very much a quasi-governmental, quasi-political organization with close ties to the Kuomintang regime, similar in many ways to the Communist Youth League of the People's Republic of China.

Over the decades the CYC has lost much of its militaristic character, shifting its focus into providing recreational services to Taiwanese and Overseas Chinese alike (such as through the annual Love Boat (study tour)), although military camps remain one of the many activities it offers. Indeed, the CYC continued to provide military education textbooks to high school students until as recently as the 1990s.

On 28 August 1989 the CYC became a non-governmental organization, thereby officially severing its ties with the Kuomintang regime; nonetheless many Taiwanese today still regard the CYC's senior management as being supportive of the Pan-Blue Coalition. On 25 October 2000, the CYC officially dropped "Anti-Communist" from its official name.

== Related organizations ==
In view of the dramatic changes in social forms, young people face many problems in adaptation. On November 11, 1969, the National Salvation Group established the "Teacher Chang Youth Guidance Center" to create the "Teacher Chang Line", engaged in youth counseling services. Until 1983, the "Teacher Chang" Youth Counseling Center was established throughout Taiwan. The main work is mainly based on letter service, telephone counseling, consultation and talks, social work: prevention and promotion, factory counseling, prevention and control of juvenile delinquency, and the implementation of counseling personnel training. Print a variety of books and magazines every year, and issue "Chang Teacher Monthly".
