= Ashley Liao =

American actress (born 2001)

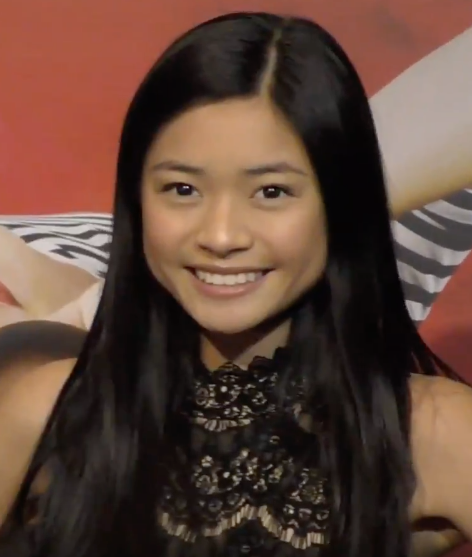
- Liao in 2016
- Born: October 21, 2001 (age 24); Orange County, California, U.S.
- Education: University of California, Los Angeles (BA)
- Occupation: Actress
- Years active: 2014–present

Ashley Liao (Chinese: 廖佳星, born October 21, 2001) is an American actress. She began her career as a child actress in the series Fuller House (2016–2020) and The Kicks (2016). She has since appeared in the Apple TV+ series Physical (2021). Her films include Secret Society of Second-Born Royals (2020), Love in Taipei (2023), and The Hunger Games: The Ballad of Songbirds & Snakes (2023).

== Early life and education ==
Liao was born in Orange County, California, United States on 21 October 2001 into a Taiwanese family. She began acting in local musical theater productions when she was in fifth grade, landing the role of Dorothy in The Wizard of Oz in her second ever production. She graduated from UCLA with a Bachelor's degree in communications.

== Career ==
After signing with an agent in 2013, Liao began her professional career with a guest appearances in Bad Teacher, followed by guest appearances in Fresh Off the Boat and Nicky, Ricky, Dicky & Dawn.

In 2016, she landed the role of Mandy in Debby Ryan produced Disney XD film Jessica Darling's It List. Liao played the role of Lola Wong in the Netflix spin-off of Full House, Fuller House for its first three seasons. She was promoted to series regular for season two. She also had a recurring role as Parker Zhao in season one of the Amazon Prime Video series The Kicks.

In 2019, she appeared in the Netflix film Always Be My Maybe as a younger version of Ali Wong's character.

She also starred in the 2020 Disney+ film Secret Society of Second Born Royals as Princess Eleanor.

Liao played Simone in the 2021 Apple TV+ series Physical.

Between 2021 and 2023, she voiced Jun Wong in the DreamWorks Peacock series Dragons: The Nine Realms.

In 2023, Liao had her first breakout movie role as Ever Wong in Love in Taipei. Within the same year, she starred as Clemensia Dovecote in The Hunger Games: The Ballad of Songbirds & Snakes, a movie adaptation of the Hunger Games prequel by the same name. She stated to be an avid fan of the franchise in her adolescence.

== Filmography ==
=== Film ===
Year	Title	Role	Notes
2016	Jessica Darling's It List	Mandy	
2019	Always Be My Maybe	Young Sasha Tran	
2020	Secret Society of Second-Born Royals	Princess Eleanor	
2023	Love in Taipei	Everett "Ever" Wong	
2023	The Hunger Games: The Ballad of Songbirds & Snakes	Clemensia Dovecote	

=== Television ===
Year	Title	Role	Notes
2014	Bad Teacher	Mary	Episode: "Nix the Fat Week"
2014	Fatrick	Young Barbara Wu	Television film
2016	Fresh Off the Boat	Audrey	Episode: "The Manchurian Dinner Date"
2016	Nicky, Ricky, Dicky & Dawn	Syd	Episode: "New Kid on the Block"
2016	The Kicks	Parker Zhao	7 episodes
2016–2020	Fuller House	Lola Wong	Recurring role (seasons 1 & 3); main role (season 2); guest (season 5)
2017	Great News	Moana	2 episodes
2018	Speechless	Maddie	Episode: "N-E-- NEW Y-- YEAR'S E-- EVE"
2018–2020	Scissor Seven	Cola (voice)	6 episodes
2019	NCIS	Hayley	Episode: "Crossing the Line"
2019	Spirit Riding Free	Jo / Caroline (voice)	Episode: "Lucky and the Dressage Sabotage"
2021	Physical	Simone	Main role (season 1)
2021–2023	DreamWorks Dragons: The Nine Realms	Jun Wong (voice)	Main role
