= Chen Chi-lu =

Politician of Taiwan

- 陳奇祿

Minister of Council for Cultural Affairs of the Republic of China
- In office 11 November 1981 – 26 July 1988
- Preceded by: Position established
- Succeeded by: Kuo Wei-fan

Personal details
- Born: 27 April 1923 Tainan, Taiwan, Empire of Japan
- Died: 6 October 2014 (aged 91) Taipei, Taiwan
- Party: Kuomintang
- Education: St. John's University (BA); University of New Mexico (MA); University of Tokyo (PhD)

Chen Chi-lu (Chinese: 陳奇祿; pinyin: Chén Qílù; 27 April 1923 – 6 October 2014) was a Taiwanese politician, historian and anthropologist. He was the first Minister of the Council for Cultural Affairs, taking office in 1981 and serving until 1988.

== Education and early career ==
Chen was born on 27 April 1923 in Tainan Prefecture during the Japanese rule of Taiwan. Chen moved with his parents when he was still a child to China, then Japan, where he attended First Senior High School in Tokyo. Chen then returned to China, enrolling at St. John's University in Shanghai. He received his bachelor's degree in political science and economics in 1948. Upon graduation from Shanghai, Chen returned to Taiwan and worked for Public Opinion Daily (Chinese: 台灣公論報) as an editor. He obtained his master's degree at the University of New Mexico in the United States in 1954. Subsequently, Chen began teaching anthropology at National Taiwan University (NTU). He earned his doctoral degree in sociology from University of Tokyo in Japan in 1966, after which he became a professor of anthropology at NTU. In 1976, he was elected an academician of the Academia Sinica.

== Later career and death ==
While leading the Council for Cultural Affairs, Chen hosted various art exhibitions, proposed the establishment of folk and cultural parks and preserved old traditional architecture in Taiwan.

Chen died on 6 October 2014 due to multiple organ failure.
