= Hsu Hsueh-chi =

Taiwanese historian (born 1953)

- 許雪姬

Director of the Institute of Taiwan History, Academia Sinica
- In office 1 September 2017 – 31 August 2023
- Preceded by: Hsieh Kuo-hsing
- Succeeded by: Chung Shu-min
- In office 1 September 2005 – 31 August 2011
- Preceded by: Chuang Ying-chang
- Succeeded by: Hsieh Kuo-hsing

Personal details
- Born: September 1953 (age 72) Penghu County, Taiwan
- Education: National Chengchi University (BA); National Taiwan University (PhD)

Hsu Hsueh-chi (Chinese: 許雪姬; born September 1953) is a Taiwanese historian. She is a distinguished research fellow of the Academia Sinica and holds an adjunct professorship within National Taiwan Normal University's Graduate Institute of Taiwan History. She specializes in the 228 incident of 1947 and ensuing White Terror period.

== Early life and education ==
Hsu was born in Penghu County in September 1953. After graduating from National Chengchi University, she earned her Ph.D. in history from National Taiwan University in 1982. Her doctoral dissertation was titled, "A Study of Taiwan's Military System During the Qing Dynasty" (Chinese: 清代台灣武備制度的研究─台灣的綠營).

In 1991, the Executive Yuan convened a committee to investigate the 228 incident, and asked her to contribute. Hsu provided oral histories to what became the Research Report on the 228 Incident. Throughout her career, Hsu has asked for continued transparency regarding historical documents relating to the 228 incident. She was invited to discuss an upcoming exhibition at the 228 Memorial Museum that eventually opened to visitors in 2011.

== Career ==
Hsu served as the director of Academia Sinica's Institute of Taiwan History from 2005 to 2011, and was reappointed between 2017 and 2023. While Hsu was director in 2011, the institute set up an exhibition titled "Her History in Taiwan," focusing on the role of women in Taiwan from 1795 to 1950. In 2014, Hsu lent support to a petition against revisions to high school history textbooks backed by the Ministry of Education, stating of the Ma Ying-jeou presidential administration, "They just do whatever they want. Their intention and anxiety to incorporate Taiwan into China is easy to see." The next year, she set up an exhibition titled "A Jail Beyond the Prison Walls" at Jing-Mei White Terror Memorial Park, focusing on women and their family members jailed or executed during the White Terror. Hsu was nominated to serve on the Transitional Justice Commission in April 2018. In materials written for review by the Legislative Yuan, she opined that the National Chiang Kai-shek Memorial Hall should remain standing to serve as a reminder of past authoritarianism, with its statue of Chiang Kai-shek moved to the Cihu Memorial Sculpture Park, suggesting an arts library or human rights museum in its place. Hsu's nomination was approved in May 2018.

Hsu's book The Compilation of Historical Data from the Secrecy Bureau on the 228 Incident, meant to "unveil the truth" about the uprising, has not yet been released. Her completed work includes a biography of Chuang Shu-chi, a book about the March 2 incident in Chiayi, and the foreword to the 2015 edition of Lin Hsien-tang's Travel Writings from around the Globe. In 2014 and 2023, Hsu published two books about Taiwanese in Manchukuo.
